A special route of the United States Numbered Highway System is a route that branches off a U.S. Highway in order to divert traffic from the main highway.  Special routes are distinguished from main routes by, in most cases, the addition of an auxiliary plate that describes what type of route it is, while the main highway carries no such sign.  In some locations, a single letter is placed after the route number to denote the special route type in lieu of the auxiliary plate.  Among members of the roadgeek community, these routes are often called auxiliary or bannered U.S. Highways.

There are four main types of special routes — alternate, business, bypass, and temporary; though other route types exist.
Alternate routes exist where an additional road is needed to meet traffic demands.  They are to be of equal character and quality compared to the main road.
Business routes carry traffic through the central business district of a community while the main highway goes around the community.
Bypasses serve the opposite purpose of business routes. Truck routes are a subset of bypasses.
Temporary routes complete a gap between two segments of main highway that exists because the main highway has not been fully constructed.

A unique type of route in the U.S. Route system uses directional letter suffixes following the route number.  These are known as divided U.S. Routes and are generally not considered to be special routes.

The following U.S. Highway special routes have existed:
 Routes are sorted by position along the main route, from south to north and west to east.
 Defunct routes are listed in italics.

US 1 – US 101

US 1

 Bus. US 1 - Florida City to Homestead, Florida
 Alt. US 1 - Daytona Beach to St. Augustine, Florida
 Bus. US 1 - St. Augustine, Florida
 Alt. US 1 - Jacksonville, Florida
 Alt. US 1 - Jacksonville, Florida
 Bus. US 1 - Waycross, Georgia
 Bus. US 1 - Swainsboro, Georgia
 Bus. US 1 - Wadley, Georgia
 Bus. US 1 - Louisville, Georgia
 Truck US 1 - Aiken, South Carolina
 Conn. US 1 - Lexington, South Carolina
 Conn. US 1 - Columbia, South Carolina
 Truck US 1 - Camden, South Carolina
 Truck US 1 - Cheraw, South Carolina
 US 1A - Moore County, North Carolina
 US 1A - Southern Pines, North Carolina
 Bus. US 1 - Southern Pines, North Carolina
 Bus. US 1 - Vass to Cameron, North Carolina
 US 1A - Sanford, North Carolina
 Bus. US 1 - Sanford, North Carolina
 Byp. US 1 - Sanford, North Carolina
 US 1A - Cary to Raleigh, North Carolina
 US 1A - Raleigh, North Carolina
 US 1A - Raleigh, North Carolina
 Bus. US 1 - Raleigh, North Carolina
 Byp. US 1 - Raleigh, North Carolina
 US 1A - Wake Forest to Youngsville, North Carolina
 US 1A - Franklinton, North Carolina
 US 1A - Henderson, North Carolina
 Bus. US 1 - Henderson, North Carolina
 Byp. US 1 - Henderson, North Carolina
 Bus. US 1 - Fredericksburg, Virginia
 Truck US 1 - Alexandria, Virginia
 Byp. US 1 - Washington, D.C.
 Alt. US 1 - Washington, D.C. to Hyattsville, Maryland
 Alt. US 1 - Arbutus to Baltimore
 Bus. US 1 - Bel Air to Hickory, Maryland
 Alt. Truck US 1 - West Grove, Pennsylvania
 Byp. US 1 - Swarthmore to Hunting Park, Pennsylvania
 Alt. Truck US 1 - Philadelphia
 Bus. US 1 - Penndel, Pennsylvania
 Alt. US 1 - Trenton, New Jersey
 Bus. US 1 - Trenton, New Jersey
 Byp. US 1 - Trenton, New Jersey
 Temp. US 1 - Newark to Jersey City, New Jersey
 Truck US 1 - Newark to Jersey City, New Jersey, via Kearny
 Bus. US 1 - Jersey City, New Jersey to New York state line at New York City (now designated New Jersey Route 139 and an at-grade portion of Interstate 78)
 US 1A - Port Chester, New York
 US 1A - Stamford, Connecticut
 US 1A - Darien, Connecticut
 US 1A - Norwalk, Connecticut
 US 1A - Bridgeport, Connecticut
 US 1A - Milford, Connecticut
 US 1A - East Haven, Connecticut
 US 1A - Branford, Connecticut
 US 1A - Old Saybrook, Connecticut
 US 1A - Waterford, Connecticut
 US 1A - Groton, Connecticut
 US 1A - Stonington, Connecticut
 Bus. US 1 - Warwick, Rhode Island
 US 1A - Norwood, Rhode Island to Massachusetts state line at Attleboro, Massachusetts, via Providence, East Providence, and Pawtucket, Rhode Island
 Byp. US 1 - Portsmouth, New Hampshire to Kittery, Maine
 US 1A - York, Maine
 US 1A - Portland, Maine
 Bus. US 1 - Newcastle to Damariscotta, Maine
 US 1A - Rockland, Maine
 US 1A - Stockton Springs to Ellsworth, Maine, via Bangor
 Bus. US 1A - Bangor to Brewer, Maine
 Byp. US 1 - Rockland, Maine
 US 1A - Milbridge to Harrington, Maine
 US 1A - Whitneyville to Machias, Maine
 US 1A - Mars Hill to Presque Isle, Maine
 US 1A - Mars Hill to Van Buren, Maine
 Byp. US 1 - Caribou, Maine

US 2

 Bus. US 2 - Cashmere, Washington
 Bus. US 2 - Wenatchee, Washington
 Bus. US 2 - Williston, North Dakota
 Bus. US 2 - Minot, North Dakota
 Byp. US 2 - Minot, North Dakota
 Bus. US 2 - Grand Forks, North Dakota to East Grand Forks, Minnesota
 Truck US 2 - Superior, Wisconsin
 Bus. US 2 - Ironwood, Michigan (used to exist in Hurley, Wisconsin)
 Bus. US 2 - Montpelier, Vermont
 Truck US 2 - St. Johnsbury, Vermont
 Alt. US 2 - Orono to Old Town, Maine
 Alt. US 2 - Macwahoc Plantation to Houlton, Maine

US 3

 Alt. US 3 – Tyngsborough, Massachusetts to Concord, New Hampshire
 Bus. US 3 – Tyngsborough, Massachusetts to Concord, New Hampshire
 Byp. US 3 – Concord, New Hampshire
 Byp. US 3 – Nashua, New Hampshire
 Bus. US 3 – Belmont to Laconia, New Hampshire (Unsigned)

US 4

 Alt. US 4 – Fair Haven to West Rutland, Vermont
 Bus. US 4 – Rutland, Vermont
 Alt. US 4 – Andover to Boscawen, New Hampshire
 Byp. US 4 – Concord, New Hampshire
 Alt. US 4 – East Northwood to Dover, New Hampshire

US 5

 Alt. US 5 (1933–1941) – New Haven to North Haven, Connecticut
 Alt. US 5 (1941–1966) – New Haven to North Haven, Connecticut
 Alt. US 5 – New Haven to Meriden, Connecticut
 Alt. US 5 (1937–1941) – Lamentation Mountain State Park to Tracy, Connecticut
 Alt. US 5 (1940s–1950s) – Lamentation Mountain State Park to Tracy, Connecticut
 Alt. US 5 – Berlin, Connecticut
 Alt. US 5 – East Hartford to East Windsorhill, Connecticut
 US 5A – Hartford–Windsor, Connecticut city line to Agawam, Massachusetts
 Byp. US 5 – South Deerfield, Massachusetts
 Alt. US 5 – St. Johnsbury to St. Johnsbury Center, Vermont
 Alt. US 5 – Newport, Vermont
 Alt. US 5 – Derby Line, Vermont

US 6

 Bus. US 6 – Ely, Nevada
 Spur US 6 – Ely, Nevada
 Temp. US 6 – Colton to Castle Gate, Utah
 Bus. US 6 – Helper, Utah
 Bus. US 6 – Price, Utah
 Bus. US 6 – Cisco, Utah
 Byp. US 6 – Grand Junction, Colorado
 Bus. US 6 - Hastings, Nebraska
 Bus. US 6 – Lincoln, Nebraska
 City US 6 – Lincoln, Nebraska
 City US 6 – Des Moines, Iowa
 City US 6 – Des Moines, Iowa
 Bus. US 6 – Davenport, Iowa
 City US 6 – Davenport, Iowa
 Temp. US 6 – Moline to Joliet, Illinois
 Bus. US 6 – Lansing, Illinois to Lake Station, Indiana
 Bus. US 6 – Bremen, Indiana
 Bus. US 6 – Napoleon, Ohio
 Alt. US 6 – Sandusky to Huron, Ohio
 Alt. US 6 – Rocky River to Cleveland, Ohio
 Alt. US 6 – Cleveland to East Cleveland, Ohio
 Alt. US 6 – Euclid to Chardon, Ohio
 Byp. US 6 – Union City, Pennsylvania
 Bus. US 6 – Warren, Pennsylvania
 Bus. US 6 – Tunkhannock Township to Tunkhannock, Pennsylvania
 Bus. US 6 – Scranton to Carbondale Township, Pennsylvania
 Alt. US 6 – Philipstown, New York
 Truck US 6 – Woodbury to Highlands, New York
 US 6A – Newtown to Southbury, Connecticut
 US 6A – Plymouth to Hartford, Connecticut
 US 6A – Woodbury to Willimantic, Connecticut
 US 6A – Coventry to Windham, Connecticut
 US 6A – Danielson, Connecticut
 Bus. US 6 – Scituate, Rhode Island
 Byp. US 6 – Scituate, Rhode Island
 Alt. US 6 – Johnston to Providence, Rhode Island
 Byp. US 6 – Johnston, Rhode Island
 Temp. US 6 – Marion to Wareham, Massachusetts
 Byp. US 6 – Bourne to Sagamore, Massachusetts
 Temp. US 6 – South Dennis to East Dennis, Massachusetts
 Temp. US 6 – Harwich to Brewster, Massachusetts

US 7
 Alt. US 7 – Burlington, Vermont

US 8
 Bus. US 8 – Rhinelander, Wisconsin

US 9

 Truck US 9 – Georgetown, Delaware
 Bus. US 9 – Five Points to Lewes, Delaware
 Temp. US 9 – Upper Township to Somers Point, New Jersey
 Alt. US 9 – South Toms River to Pleasant Plains, New Jersey
 Alt. US 9 – Jersey City, New Jersey to Inwood Hill Park, New York
 Temp. US 9 – Newark to Jersey City, New Jersey
 Truck US 9 – Newark to Jersey City, New Jersey
 Bus. US 9 – Jersey City, New Jersey to New Jersey/New York state line at New York City
 Alt. US 9W – Newburgh, New York
 Alt. US 9 – Rouses Point, New York

US 10

 Alt. US 10 – Seattle, Washington
 Alt. US 10 – Seattle, Washington to Missoula, Montana
 Bus. US 10 – Coeur d'Alene, Idaho
 Alt. US 10 – Drummond to Opportunity, Montana
 Byp. US 10 – Butte, Montana
 Byp. US 10S – Butte, Montana
 Byp. US 10 – Billings, Montana
 Bus. US 10 – Valley City, North Dakota
 Bus. US 10 – Neillsville, Wisconsin
 Bus. US 10 – Manitowoc, Wisconsin
 Bus. US 10 – Reed City, Michigan
 Bus. US 10 – Clare, Michigan
 Bus. US 10 – Midland, Michigan
 Bus. US 10 – Flint, Michigan
 Bus. US 10 – Pontiac, Michigan (replaced by Bus. US 24)

US 11

 Bus. US 11 – Meridian, Mississippi
 Byp. US 11 – Tuscaloosa, Alabama
 Truck US 11 – Birmingham, Alabama
 Alt. US 11 – Chattanooga, Tennessee
 Bus. US 11 – Chattanooga, Tennessee
 Byp. US 11 – Chattanooga, Tennessee
 Byp. US 11 – Cleveland, Tennessee
 Bus. US 11 – Riceville to Athens, Tennessee
 Bus. US 11E – Greeneville, Tennessee
 Truck US 11 – Bristol, Virginia
 Alt. US 11 – Salem to Roanoke, Virginia
 Bus. US 11 – Lexington, Virginia
 Byp. US 11 – Lexington, Virginia
 Bus. US 11 – Staunton, Virginia
 Truck US 11 – Staunton, Virginia
 Alt. US 11 – Winchester, Virginia
 Byp. US 11 – Lemoyne, Pennsylvania
 Alt. US 11 – Lemoyne, Pennsylvania

US 12

 Bus. US 12 – Walla Walla, Washington
 Bus. US 12 – Missoula, Montana
 Bus. US 12 – Helena, Montana
 Byp. US 12 – Helena, Montana
 Temp. US 12 – Fallon to Ismay, Montana
 Bus. US 12 – Eau Claire, Wisconsin
 City US 12 – Eau Claire, Wisconsin
 Bus. US 12 – Lake Delton to West Baraboo, Wisconsin
 Bus. US 12 – Sauk City to Prairie du Sac, Wisconsin
 City US 12 – Madison, Wisconsin
 Bus. US 12 - Madison, Wisconsin
 Byp. US 12 - Madison, Wisconsin
 Bus. US 12 – Fort Atkinson, Wisconsin
 Bus. US 12 – Whitewater, Wisconsin
 Temp. US 12 – Big Foot to Crystal Lake, Illinois
 Bus. US 12 – Des Plaines to Chicago
 City US 12 – Des Plaines to Chicago, Illinois
 Toll US 12 – Chicago, Illinois to Hammond, Indiana
 Bus. US 12 – Niles, Michigan
 Alt. US 12 – Kalamazoo, Michigan
 Bus. US 12 – Kalamazoo, Michigan
 Alt. US 12 – Battle Creek to Springfield, Michigan
 Bus. US 12 – Battle Creek, Michigan
 Bus. US 12 – Marshall, Michigan
 Bus. US 12 – Albion, Michigan
 Bus. US 12 – Jackson, Michigan
 Bus. US 12 – Ypsilanti, Michigan

US 13

 Alt. US 13 – Bethel to Williamston, North Carolina
 Bus. US 13 – Bethel, North Carolina
 US 13A – Windsor, North Carolina
 Bus. US 13 – Windsor, North Carolina
 Bus. US 13 – Suffolk, Virginia
 Spur US 13 – Norfolk, Virginia
 Bus. US 13 – Cape Junction to Cheriton, Virginia
 Byp. US 13 – Cheriton, Virginia
 Bus. US 13 – Eastville, Virginia
 Byp. US 13 – Eastville, Virginia
 Bus. US 13 – Exmore, Virginia
 Byp. US 13 – Exmore, Virginia
 Bus. US 13 – Onley to Accomac, Virginia
 Byp. US 13 – Tasley, Virginia
 Byp. US 13 – Accomac, Virginia
 Bus. US 13 – Pocomoke City, Maryland
 Bus. US 13 – Fruitland to Salisbury, Maryland
 Alt. US 13 – Delmar to Seaford, Delaware
 Bus. US 13 – Bridgeville, Delaware
 Alt. US 13 – Bridgeville, Delaware
 Alt. US 13 – Woodside to Camden, Delaware
 Alt. US 13 – Rodney Village to Dover, Delaware
 Bus. US 13 – Wilmington, Delaware
 Alt. US 13 – Wilmington to Claymont, Delaware
 Byp. US 13 – Claymont, Delaware to Chester, Pennsylvania
 Bus. US 13 - Trainer to Chester, Pennsylvania
 Byp. US 13 – Chester to Collingdale, Pennsylvania
 Byp. US 13 – Darby to Hunting Park, Pennsylvania
 Alt. Truck US 13 – Bensalem Township, Pennsylvania

US 14

 Alt. US 14 – Cody to Burgess Junction, Wyoming
 Bus. US 14 – Sheridan, Wyoming
 US 14A – Spearfish to Sturgis, South Dakota
 Bus. US 14 – Rapid City, South Dakota
 Truck US 14 - Pierre, South Dakota
 Bus. US 14 - Huron, South Dakota
 Byp. US 14 – Brookings, South Dakota
 Bus. US 14 – Dodge Center, Minnesota
 Bus. US 14 – Madison, Wisconsin
 City US 14 – Madison, Wisconsin
 Bus. US 14 – Janesville, Wisconsin
 City US 14 – Janesville, Wisconsin
 Bus. US 14 – Woodstock, Illinois

US 15

 Alt. US 15/US 15A – Walterboro, South Carolina to Creedmoor, North Carolina
 Conn. US 15 – Santee, South Carolina
 Conn. US 15 – Summerton, South Carolina
 Conn. US 15 – Sumter to East Sumter, South Carolina
 Alt. US 15 – Sumter to Society Hill, South Carolina
 Alt. US 15 – Dubose to Manville, South Carolina
 Alt. US 15 – Hartsville, South Carolina
 Bus. US 15 – Hartsville, South Carolina
 Truck US 15 – Hartsville, South Carolina
 Bus. US 15 – Bennettsville, South Carolina
 Bus. US 15 – Laurinburg, North Carolina
 US 15A – Sanford, North Carolina
 Bus. US 15 – Sanford, North Carolina
 Byp. US 15 – Sanford, North Carolina
 US 15A – Chapel Hill, North Carolina
 Bus. US 15 – Chapel Hill, North Carolina
 Bus. US 15 – Durham, North Carolina
 Byp. US 15 – Durham, North Carolina
 Truck US 15 – Oxford, North Carolina
 Bus. US 15 – Clarksville, Virginia
 Bus. US 15 – Keysville, Virginia
 Bus. US 15 – Farmville, Virginia
 Alt. US 15 - Farmville, Virginia
 Bus. US 15 – Culpeper, Virginia
 Bus. US 15 – Remington, Virginia
 Bus. US 15 – Warrenton, Virginia
 Temp. US 15 – Warrenton to Aldie, Virginia
 Bus. US 15 – Leesburg, Virginia
 Byp. US 15 – Leesburg, Virginia
 Bus. US 15 – Emmitsburg, Maryland
 Bus. US 15 – Gettysburg, Pennsylvania
 Bus. US 15 - Shamokin Dam, Pennsylvania
 Bus. US 15 – Mansfield, Pennsylvania

US 16

 Bus. US 16 - Newcastle, Wyoming
 Truck US 16 - Newcastle, Wyoming
 US 16A – Custer to Keystone, South Dakota
 US 16A – Custer to Keystone, South Dakota
 Byp. US 16 – Hill City, South Dakota
 Truck US 16 - Hill City, South Dakota
 Bus. US 16 – Rapid City, South Dakota
 Byp. US 16 – Rapid City, South Dakota
 Truck US 16 - Rapid City, South Dakota
 Alt. US 16 – Wall to Kadoka, South Dakota
 Bus. US 16 – Watertown, Wisconsin
 Bus. US 16 – Grand Rapids, Michigan
 Byp. US 16 – Grand Rapids, Michigan
 US 16A – Novi to Farmington, Michigan
 Bus. US 16 – Farmington, Michigan

US 17

 Truck US 17 – Kissimmee, Florida
 Truck US 17 – Winter Park to Maitland, Florida
 Alt. US 17 – Jacksonville, Florida
 Alt. US 17 – Jacksonville, Florida
 Alt. US 17 – Savannah, Georgia
 Alt. US 17 – Savannah, Georgia to near Limehouse, South Carolina
 Alt. US 17 – Ridgeland, South Carolina
 Alt. US 17 – near Pocotaligo to Georgetown, South Carolina
 Alt. US 17 – Yemassee, South Carolina
 Conn. US 17 – Yemassee, South Carolina
 Alt. US 17 – Rantowles to Parkers Ferry, South Carolina
 Alt. US 17 – Ridgeville, South Carolina
 Alt. Truck US 17 – Summerville, South Carolina
 Alt. US 17 – Charleston, South Carolina
 Bus. US 17 – Mount Pleasant, South Carolina
 Alt. US 17 – Myrtle Beach, South Carolina
 Conn. US 17 – Murrells Inlet to Garden City, South Carolina
 Bus. US 17 – Myrtle Beach, South Carolina
 Byp. US 17 – Myrtle Beach, South Carolina
 Bus. US 17 – Shallotte, North Carolina
 Bus. US 17 – Bolivia, North Carolina
 US 17-1 – North Carolina to Virginia
 Bus. US 17 – Wilmington, North Carolina
 Truck US 17 – Wilmington, North Carolina
 Byp. US 17 - Hampstead, North Carolina
 Bus. US 17 – Jacksonville, North Carolina
 Bus. US 17 – New Bern, North Carolina
 Bus. US 17 – Vanceboro, North Carolina
 Bus. US 17 – Chocowinity to Washington, North Carolina
 Byp. US 17 – Washington, North Carolina
 Alt. US 17 – Williamston, North Carolina
 Bus. US 17 – Williamston, North Carolina
 Alt. US 17 – Windsor, North Carolina
 Byp. US 17 – Windsor, North Carolina
 Bus. US 17 – Edenton, North Carolina
 Bus. US 17 – Hertford to Winfall, North Carolina
 Alt. US 17 – Elizabeth City, North Carolina
 Bus. US 17 – Elizabeth City, North Carolina
 Bus. Truck US 17 - Elizabeth City, North Carolina
 Byp. US 17 – Elizabeth City, North Carolina
 Bus. Truck US 17 – Elizabeth City, North Carolina
 Bus. US 17 – South Mills, North Carolina
 Bus. US 17 – Chesapeake, Virginia
 Bus. US 17 – Portsmouth, Virginia
 Bus. US 17 – Gloucester Courthouse, Virginia
 Bus. US 17 – Saluda, Virginia
 Bus. US 17 – Fredericksburg, Virginia
 Byp. US 17 – Fredericksburg, Virginia
 Bus. US 17 – Warrenton, Virginia
 Bus. US 17 – Marshall, Virginia

US 18

 Byp. US 18 – Hot Springs, South Dakota
 Truck US 18 – Hot Springs, South Dakota
 Bus. US 18 – Clear Lake, Iowa to Mason City, Iowa
 Bus. US 18 – Mendon Township to Marquette, Iowa
 Bus. US 18 – Mount Horeb, Wisconsin
 Bus. US 18 – Verona, Wisconsin
 Alt. US 18 – Milwaukee, Wisconsin

US 19

 Alt. US 19 – Bayonet Point to Brooksville, Florida
 Alt. US 19 – St. Petersburg to Holiday, Florida
 Bus. US 19 – Thomasville to Meigs, Georgia
 Bus. US 19 – Albany, Georgia
 Byp. US 19 – Leesburg, Georgia
 Bus. US 19 – Griffin, Georgia
 Bus. US 19 – Southeast of Hapeville to Atlanta, Georgia
 Bus. US 19 – Dahlonega, Georgia
 Bus. US 19 – Murphy, North Carolina
 Bus. US 19 – Andrews, North Carolina
 Truck US 19 – Bryson City to Lake Junaluska, North Carolina
 Conn. US 19 – Bryson City, North Carolina
 US 19A – Waynesville, North Carolina
 US 19A – Ela to Lake Junaluska, North Carolina
 US 19A – Bryson City to Lake Junaluska, North Carolina
 Byp. US 19 – Bryson City to Lake Junaluska, North Carolina
 US 19A – Asheville, North Carolina
 Bus. US 19 – Asheville, North Carolina
 Bus. US 19 – Woodfin to Weaverville, North Carolina
 US 19A – Cane River to Elk Park, North Carolina
 Truck US 19 – Bristol, Virginia
 Bus. US 19 – Lebanon, Virginia
 Bus. US 19 – Tazewell, Virginia
 Alt. US 19 - Prosperity, West Virginia
 Spur US 19 - Fairmont, West Virginia
 Bus. US 19 – Beckley, West Virginia
 Truck US 19 – Mt. Lebanon to Wexford, Pennsylvania, via Pittsburgh
 Truck US 19 - Harlansburg, Pennsylvania

US 20

 Bus. US 20 - Toledo, Oregon
 Bus. US 20 - Bend, Oregon
 Temp. US 20 - Mountain Home to Carey, Idaho
 Bus. US 20 - Idaho Falls, Idaho
 Bus. US 20 - Rigby, Idaho
 Alt. US 20 - Sugar City, Idaho to Jackson, Wyoming
 Bus. US 20 - St. Anthony, Idaho
 Bus. US 20 - Mountain View to Casper, Wyoming
 Byp. US 20 - Mountain View to Casper, Wyoming
 Bus. US 20 - Douglas, Wyoming
 Byp. US 20 - Manville, Wyoming
 Bus. US 20 - South Sioux City, Nebraska to Sioux City, Iowa
 Bus. US 20 - Fort Dodge, Iowa
 Bus. US 20 - Freeport, Illinois
 Bus. US 20 - Rockford to Belvidere, Illinois
 Bus. US 20 - Elgin, Illinois
 City US 20 - Elmhurst to Chicago
 Bus. US 20 - Melrose Park to Chicago, Illinois
 Toll Bus. US 20 - Chicago, Illinois to Hammond, Indiana
 Alt. US 20 - Tremont to Michigan City, Indiana
 Bus. US 20 - South Bend to Mishawaka, Indiana
 Byp. US 20 - South Bend to Elkhart, Indiana
 Truck US 20 - Osceola to Elkhart, Indiana
 US 20A - northwest of Holiday City to Maumee, Ohio (originally US 20S)
 Bus. US 20 - Toledo to Gibsonburg Junction, Ohio
 Truck US 20 - Perrysburg, Ohio
 Bus. US 20 - Fremont, Ohio
 US 20A - Rocky River to Cleveland, Ohio
 US 20A - Cleveland to East Cleveland, Ohio
 Truck US 20 - Silver Creek, New York
 US 20A - Big Tree to South Bloomfield, New York
 Byp. US 20 - Lenox, Massachusetts

US 21

 Bus. US 21 - Beaufort, South Carolina
 Alt. US 21 - Yemassee, South Carolina
 Alt. US 21 - Rowesville, South Carolina
 Alt. US 21 - Orangeburg, South Carolina
 Bus. US 21 - Orangeburg, South Carolina
 Bus. US 21 - Orangeburg, South Carolina
 Byp. US 21 - Orangeburg, South Carolina
 Conn. US 21 - Orangeburg, South Carolina
 Spur US 21 - Orangeburg, South Carolina
 Conn. US 21 - West Columbia, South Carolina
 Conn. US 21 - Columbia, South Carolina
 Spur US 21 - Columbia, South Carolina
 Alt. US 21 - Ridgeway, South Carolina
 Conn. US 21 - Ridgeway, South Carolina
 Bus. US 21 - Fort Mill, South Carolina
 Alt. US 21 - Rock Hill, South Carolina
 Bus. US 21 - Rock Hill, South Carolina
 Bus. US 21 - Rock Hill to Fort Mill, South Carolina
 Bus. US 21 - Jonesville to Elkin, North Carolina
 Truck US 21 - Sparta, North Carolina
 Byp. US 21 - Bluefield, West Virginia
 Temp. US 21 - Cuyahoga Heights to Cleveland, Ohio

US 22

 Temp. US 22 - Green Tree to Pittsburgh, Pennsylvania
 Truck US 22 - Pittsburgh, Pennsylvania
 Bus. US 22 - Churchill to Monroeville, Pennsylvania
 Bus. US 22 - Granville Township to Derry Township
 Byp. US 22 - Harrisburg, Pennsylvania
 Alt. US 22 - Bethlehem to Easton, Pennsylvania
 Alt. US 22 - Phillipsburg, New Jersey
 Byp. US 22 - Easton, Pennsylvania to Phillipsburg, New Jersey

US 23

 Bus. US 23 - Waycross, Georgia
 Bus. US 23 - Hazlehurst, Georgia
 Bus. US 23 - Cochran, Georgia
 Bus. US 23 - Baldwin to Cornelia, Georgia
 Bus. US 23 - Dillsboro to east of Sylva, North Carolina
 Bus. US 23 - Hazelwood to Waynesville, North Carolina
 Alt. US 23 - Waynesville, North Carolina
 Alt. US 23 - Clyde to Canton, North Carolina
 Alt. US 23 - Asheville, North Carolina
 Bus. US 23 - Asheville, North Carolina
 Bus. US 23 - Weaverville, North Carolina
 US 23A - Wolf Laurel, North Carolina
 Bus. US 23 - Gate City, Virginia
 Bus. US 23 - Big Stone Gap to Norton, Virginia, via Appalachia
 Bus. US 23 - Wise, Virginia
 Bus. US 23 - Pound, Virginia
 Byp. US 23 - Pound, Virginia
 Bus. US 23 - Pikeville, Kentucky
 Byp. US 23 - Pikeville, Kentucky
 Spur US 23 - Pikeville, Kentucky
 Bus. US 23 - Paintsville, Kentucky
 Bus. US 23 - Ashland, Kentucky
 Spur US 23 - Ashland, Kentucky
 Truck US 23 - South Portsmouth, Kentucky to Portsmouth, Ohio
 Bus. US 23 - Chillicothe, Ohio
 Bus. US 23 - Perrysburg to Toledo, Ohio
 Bus. US 23 - Ann Arbor, Michigan
 Bus. US 23 - Fenton, Michigan
 Bus. US 23 - Bridgeport to Saginaw, Michigan
 Bus. US 23 - Bay City, Michigan
 Bus. US 23 - Rogers City, Michigan

US 24

 Bus. US 24 – Manitou Springs to Colorado Springs, Colorado
 Bus. US 24 – Goodland, Kansas
 Opt. US 24 – Kansas City to Independence, Missouri
 Bus. US 24 – Napoleon to Lexington, Missouri
 Bus. US 24 – Carrollton, Missouri
 City US 24 – Kirksville, Missouri
 Bus. US 24 – Paris, Missouri
 Bus. US 24 – Washington, Illinois
 Bus. US 24 – Logansport to Richvalley, Indiana
 Bus. US 24 – Peru, Indiana
 Bus. US 24 – Wabash, Indiana
 Truck US 24 – Fort Wayne, Indiana
 Alt. US 24 – Toledo, Ohio to Erie, Michigan (Originally Alt. US 25)
 Bus. US 24 – Perrysburg to Toledo, Ohio
 US 24A - southwest of Luna Pier to Erie, Michigan
 Bus. US 24 – Pontiac, Michigan

US 25

 Byp. US 25 - Statesboro, Georgia
 Byp. US 25 - Waynesboro, Georgia
 Bus. US 25 - Augusta, Georgia to North Augusta, South Carolina
 Bus. US 25 - Augusta, Georgia to North Augusta, South Carolina
 Conn. US 25 - North Augusta, South Carolina
 Truck US 25 - North Augusta, South Carolina
 Alt. US 25 - Edgefield, South Carolina
 Bus. US 25 - Edgefield, South Carolina
 Truck US 25 - Edgefield, South Carolina
 Bus. US 25 - Greenwood, South Carolina
 Alt. US 25 - Hodges, South Carolina
 Bus. US 25 - Ware Shoals, South Carolina
 Bus. US 25 - Greenville, South Carolina
 Alt. US 25 - Greenville to near Travelers Rest, South Carolina
 Conn. US 25 - Travelers Rest, South Carolina
 Bus. US 25 - Flat Rock, North Carolina – Hendersonville, North Carolina
 US 25A - Hendersonville, North Carolina
 US 25A - Arden to Asheville, North Carolina
 Bus. US 25 - Marshall, North Carolina
 Truck US 25 - Corbin, Kentucky
 Bus. US 25 - Richmond, Kentucky
 Bus. US 25 - Lexington, Kentucky
 Truck US 25 - Lexington, Kentucky
 Bus. US 25 - Williamstown to Dry Ridge, Kentucky
 Bus. US 25 - Covington, Kentucky
 Bus. US 25 - Perrysburg to Toledo, Ohio
 Alt. US 25 - Toledo, Ohio to Erie, Michigan
 Bus. US 25 - Toledo, Ohio
 US 25A - Erie, Michigan
 US 25A - Port Huron, Michigan
 Bus. US 25 - Port Huron, Michigan

US 26
 Bus. US 26 – Ririe, Idaho
 Bus. US 26 – Mountain View to Casper, Wyoming
 Byp. US 26 – Mountain View to Casper, Wyoming
 Bus. US 26 – Douglas, Wyoming
 City US 26 – Scottsbluff, Nebraska

US 27

 Alt. US 27 - Sebring to Avon Park, Florida
 Temp. US 27 - Sebring to Leesburg, Florida
 Alt. US 27 - Lady Lake to Belleview, Florida
 Alt. US 27 - Haines City to Sunray Deli Estates, Florida
 Alt. US 27 - Williston to Perry, Florida
 Bus. US 27 - Attapulgus, Georgia
 Bus. US 27 - Bainbridge, Georgia
 Bus. US 27 - Blakely, Georgia
 Bus. US 27 - Cuthbert, Georgia
 Alt. US 27 - Columbus to Carrollton, Georgia
 Bus. US 27 - Bremen, Georgia
 Bus. US 27 - Buchanan, Georgia
 Bus. US 27 - Cedartown, Georgia
 Bus. US 27 - LaFayette, Georgia
 Bus. US 27 - Chattanooga, Tennessee
 Bus. US 27 - Dayton, Tennessee
 Bus. US 27 - Nicholasville, Kentucky
 Bus. US 27 - Cynthiana, Kentucky
 Conn. US 27 - Cynthiana, Kentucky
 City US 27 - Newport, Kentucky to Cincinnati
 Temp. US 27 - Newport, Kentucky to Cincinnati, Ohio
 Truck US 27 - Cincinnati, Ohio
 Truck US 27 - Fort Wayne, Indiana
 Bus. US 27 - Marshall, Michigan
 Bus. US 27 - Charlotte, Michigan
 Bus. US 27 - Lansing, Michigan
 Truck US 27 - Lansing, Michigan
 Bus. US 27 - St. Johns, Michigan
 Bus. US 27 - Ithaca, Michigan
 US 27A - Alma, Michigan
 Bus. US 27 - Alma, Michigan
 Bus. US 27 - St. Louis, Michigan
 Bus. US 27 - Mount Pleasant, Michigan
 Bus. US 27 - Clare, Michigan
 Bus. US 27 - Harrison, Michigan

US 29

 Truck US 29 - Union Springs, Alabama
 Bus. US 29 - LaGrange, Georgia
 Alt. US 29 - Palmetto to Red Oak, Georgia
 Bus. US 29 - Decatur, Georgia
 Bus. US 29 - Lawrenceville to Winder, Georgia
 Bus. US 29 - Lawrenceville to Athens, Georgia
 Temp. US 29 - Athens, Georgia
 Alt. US 29 - Anderson, South Carolina
 Bus. US 29 - Anderson, South Carolina
 Conn. US 29 - Williamston, South Carolina
 Alt. US 29 - Greenville, South Carolina
 Bus. US 29 - Greenville, South Carolina
 Conn. US 29 - Greenville, South Carolina
 Spur US 29 - Greenville, South Carolina
 Alt. US 29 - Greenville to Taylors, South Carolina
 Alt. US 29 - Greenville to Taylors, South Carolina
 Conn. US 29 - Greenville to Wade Hampton, South Carolina
 Alt. US 29 - Wellford, South Carolina
 Alt. US 29 - Lyman to North Carolina state line northeast of Blacksburg, South Carolina
 Alt. US 29 - Fairforest, South Carolina
 Conn. US 29 - Spartanburg, South Carolina
 US 29A - Bessemer City, North Carolina
 Bus. US 29 - Charlotte, North Carolina
 Alt. US 29 - Concord to China Grove, North Carolina
 US 29A (1938–1940) - Kannapolis, North Carolina
 US 29A (1940–1948) - Kannapolis, North Carolina
 US 29A (1948–1997) - Kannapolis, North Carolina
 US 29A - Salisbury, North Carolina
 Bus. US 29 - Salisbury, North Carolina
 US 29A - Lexington, North Carolina
 Bus. US 29 - Lexington, North Carolina
 US 29A - Thomasville, North Carolina
 Bus. US 29 - Thomasville, North Carolina
 US 29A (1934–1948) - High Point, North Carolina
 US 29A (1948–1991) - High Point to Greensboro, North Carolina
 US 29A - Greensboro, North Carolina
 Bus. US 29 - Monticello to Ruffin, North Carolina, via Reidsville
 US 29A - Reidsville, North Carolina
 Bus. US 29 (1960–73) - Reidsville, North Carolina
 Bus. US 29 - Pelham, North Carolina to Danville, Virginia
 Alt. US 29 (1936–1941) - Danville, Virginia
 Alt. US 29 (1941–1970) - Danville, Virginia
 Bus. US 29 (1970–1998) - Danville, Virginia
 Bus. US 29 (1996–) - Danville, Virginia to Blairs, Virginia
 Bus. US 29 - Chatham, Virginia
 Bus. US 29 - Gretna, Virginia
 Bus. US 29 - Hurt, Virginia to Altavista, Virginia
 Alt. US 29 - Lynchburg, Virginia
 Bus. US 29 (1971–2005) - Lynchburg, Virginia
 Bus. US 29 (1969–) - Lynchburg to Amherst, Virginia
 Bus. US 29 - Lovingston, Virginia
 Bus. US 29 - Charlottesville, Virginia
 Bus. US 29 - Madison, Virginia
 Bus. US 29 - Culpeper, Virginia
 Bus. US 29 - Remington, Virginia
 Bus. US 29 - Warrenton, Virginia

US 30

 Bus. US 30 - St. Helens, Oregon
 Alt. US 30 - Portland, Oregon
 Bus. US 30 - Portland, Oregon
 Byp. US 30 - Portland, Oregon
 Bus. US 30 - Huntington, Oregon
 Bus. US 30 - Ontario, Oregon
 Bus. US 30 - Pocatello, Idaho
 Bus. US 30N - Pocatello, Idaho
 Bus. US 30 - Lava Hot Springs, Idaho
 Byp. US 30 - Kemmerer to Diamondville, Wyoming
 Bus. US 30 - Green River, Wyoming
 Bus. US 30 - Rock Springs, Wyoming
 Bus. US 30 - Rawlins, Wyoming
 Bus. US 30 - Pine Bluffs, Wyoming to Bushnell, Nebraska
 US 30A - Clarks, Nebraska to Missouri Valley, Iowa
 Bus. US 30 - Wahoo, Nebraska
 City US 30 - Wahoo, Nebraska
 City US 30A - Wahoo, Nebraska
 Bus. US 30 - Fremont, Nebraska
 Alt. US 30 - Clarks, Nebraska to Missouri Valley, Iowa
 Alt. US 30 - Ogden to Marshalltown, Iowa
 Bus. US 30 - Marshalltown, Iowa
 Bus. US 30 - Toledo to Tama, Iowa
 Emergency US 30 - Cedar Rapids, Iowa
 Alt. US 30 - Clinton, Iowa to Fulton, Illinois
 Alt. US 30 - Sterling to Chicago, Illinois
 Toll US 30 - Aurora to Ford Heights, Illinois
 Bus. US 30 - Aurora, Illinois
 City US 30 - Aurora, Illinois
 Bus. US 30 - Fort Wayne, Indiana
 Bus. US 30 - Van Wert, Ohio
 Bus. US 30 - Upper Sandusky, Ohio
 Bus. US 30 - Bucyrus, Ohio
 Alt. US 30 - Dalton, Ohio
 Truck US 30 - Clinton to Robinson Township, Pennsylvania
 Temp. US 30 - Green Tree to Pittsburgh
 Bus. US 30 - Bedford, Pennsylvania
 Bus. US 30 - Everett, Pennsylvania
 Bus. US 30 - Frazer to Parkesburg, Pennsylvania
 Bus. Alt. Truck US 30 - Downingtown, Pennsylvania
 Alt. US 30 - Bryn Mawr to Philadelphia, Pennsylvania
 Byp. US 30 - Bryn Mawr to Philadelphia, Pennsylvania

US 31

 Bus. US 31 - Montgomery, Alabama
 City US 31 - Montgomery, Alabama
 Truck US 31 - Montgomery, Alabama
 US 31A - Pulaski to Nashville, Tennessee
 Bus. US 31A - Lewisburg, Tennessee
 Truck US 31 - Franklin, Tennessee
 Byp. US 31E - Hendersonville, Tennessee (unsigned)
 Bus. US 31E - Scottsville, Kentucky
 Byp. US 31W - Bowling Green, Kentucky
 Bus. US 31E - Glasgow, Kentucky
 Byp. US 31W - Elizabethtown, Kentucky
 Truck US 31W - Elizabethtown, Kentucky
 Truck US 31E - Bardstown, Kentucky
 Bus. US 31W - West Point, Kentucky
 US 31EX - Mount Washington, Kentucky
 Alt. US 31 - Dudleytown to Columbus, Indiana
 Byp. US 31 - Kokomo, Indiana
 Bus. US 31 - Peru, Indiana
 Alt. US 31 - Plymouth, Indiana
 Bus. US 31 - Plymouth, Indiana
 Bus. US 31 - South Bend, Indiana
 Byp. US 31 - South Bend, Indiana (may or may not have existed)
 Bus. US 31 - Niles to Niles Charter Township, Michigan
 Bus. US 31 - South Haven Charter Township to Casco Township, Michigan
 Bus. US 31 - Holland to Holland Charter Township, Michigan
 US 31A - Muskegon Heights to Muskegon, Michigan
 Bus. US 31 - Norton Shores to Muskegon Township, Michigan
 Bus. US 31 - Whitehall Township to Montague Township, Michigan
 Bus. US 31 - Hart Township to Hart, Michigan
 Bus. US 31 - Weare Township to Pentwater Township, Michigan
 Bus. US 31 - Pere Marquette Charter Township, Michigan

US 33
 Bus. US 33 – Stanardsville, Virginia
 Bus. US 33 – Elkton, Virginia
 Bus. US 33 – Nelsonville, Ohio
 Bus. US 33 – Lancaster, Ohio
 Bus. US 33 – Fort Wayne, Indiana
 Truck US 33 – Fort Wayne, Indiana

US 34

 Bus. US 34 - Estes Park, Colorado
 Bus. US 34 - Greeley, Colorado
 Bus. US 34 - Brush, Colorado
 Bus. US 34 - Glenwood, Iowa
 Bus. US 34 - Chariton, Iowa
 Bus. US 34 - Ottumwa, Iowa
 Bus. US 34 - Fairfield, Iowa
 Bus. US 34 - Westwood to Mount Pleasant, Iowa

US 35
 Spur US 35 – Scott Depot, West Virginia
 Temp. US 35 – Point Pleasant, West Virginia to Kanauga, Ohio
 Bus. US 35 – Jackson, Ohio
 Bus. US 35 – Xenia, Ohio
 Byp. US 35 – Xenia, Ohio

US 36

 Bus US 36 – St. Joseph, Missouri
 Bus. US 36 – Cameron, Missouri
 Bus. US 36 – Hamilton, Missouri
 Bus. US 36 – Mooresville, Missouri
 Bus. US 36 – Chillicothe, Missouri
 Bus. US 36 – Brookfield, Missouri
 Bus. US 36 – Macon, Missouri
 Spur US 36 - Macon, Missouri
 Bus. US 36 – Clarence, Missouri
 Bus. US 36 – Shelbina, Missouri
 Bus. US 36 – Monroe City, Missouri
 Bus. US 36 – Hannibal, Missouri
 City US 36 - Hannibal, Missouri
 Temp. US 36 – Baker to Greenville, Ohio

US 40

 Bus. US 40 - Oakland to Berkeley, California
 Temp. US 40 - American Canyon to Cordelia, California
 Bus. US 40 - West Sacramento, California
 Bus. US 40 - North Sacramento, California
 Alt. US 40 - Davis, California to Reno, Nevada
 Alt. US 40 - Salt Lake City, Utah
 Alt. US 40 - Park City, Utah
 Temp. US 40 - Steamboat Springs to Kremmling, Colorado
 Bus. US 40 - WaKeeney, Kansas
 Bus. US 40 - Russell, Kansas
 City US 40 - Salina, Kansas
 Alt. US 40 - Junction City to Grandview Plaza, Kansas
 Bus. US 40 - Junction City to Grandview Plaza, Kansas
 Temp. US 40 - Junction City to Manhattan, Kansas
 Temp. US 40 - Junction City to Topeka, Kansas
 Bus. US 40 - Kansas City, Kansas
 Opt. US 40 - Kansas City, Missouri
 City US 40 - Kansas City, Missouri
 Alt. US 40 - Kansas City to Independence, Missouri
 Opt. US 40 - Kansas City to Leeds, Missouri
 Opt. US 40 - Independence to Kansas City, Missouri
 Bus. US 40 - Columbia, Missouri
 Byp. US 40 - Wentzville, Missouri to Troy, Illinois
 City US 40 - Pattonville to St. Louis, Missouri
 Truck US 40 - Frontenac, Missouri to East St. Louis, Illinois
 Alt. US 40 - Bridgeton to St. Louis, Missouri
 Bus. US 40 - St. Louis, Missouri
 Spur US 40 - St. Louis, Missouri
 Bus. US 40 - East St. Louis to Collinsville, Illinois
 City US 40 - East St. Louis to Collinsville, Illinois
 Alt. US 40 - East St. Louis to Collinsville, Illinois
 Alt. US 40 - Greenville to Vandalia, Illinois
 Temp. US 40 - Columbus to Bexley, Ohio
 Spur US 40 - Wheeling, West Virginia
 Alt. US 40 - Washington, Pennsylvania
 Thru US 40 - Washington, Pennsylvania
 Bus. US 40 - Brownsville, Pennsylvania
 Alt. US 40 - Uniontown, Pennsylvania
 Bus. US 40 - Uniontown to Hopwood, Pennsylvania
 Alt. US 40 - Keysers Ridge to Cumberland, Maryland
 Scenic US 40 - Bellegrove to Piney Grove, Maryland
 Alt. US 40 - Hagerstown to Frederick, Maryland
 Truck US 40 - Baltimore, Maryland

US 41

 Temp. US 41 - Naples Manor to Naples Park, Florida
 Bus. US 41 - Fort Myers to North Fort Myers, Florida
 Bus. US 41 - Venice, Florida
 Bus. US 41 - Bradenton, Florida
 Bus. US 41 - Palm River-Clair Mel to north of Tampa, Florida
 Bus. US 41 - Valdosta, Georgia
 Bus. US 41 - Macon, Georgia
 Bus. US 41 - Griffin, Georgia
 Bus. US 41 - Southeast of Hapeville to Atlanta, Georgia
 City US 41 - Atlanta, Georgia
 Alt. US 41 - Atlanta to Marietta, Georgia
 Byp. US 41 - Atlanta to Marietta, Georgia
 Temp. US 41 - Atlanta to Marietta, Georgia
 Temp. US 41 - Atlanta to Smyrna, Georgia
 Temp. US 41 - Atlanta to Smyrna, Georgia
 Temp. US 41 - Atlanta, Georgia
 Bus. US 41 - Cartersville, Georgia
 Truck US 41 - Ringgold, Georgia
 Alt. US 41 - Monteagle, Tennessee to Hopkinsville, Kentucky
 Byp. US 41A - Clarksville, Tennessee
 Truck US 41 - Hopkinsville, Kentucky
 Alt. US 41 - Madisonville to Henderson, Kentucky
 Bus. US 41 - Terre Haute, Indiana
 Bus. US 41 - Vincennes, Indiana
 Bus. US 41 - Princeton, Indiana
 Bus. US 41 - Evansville, Indiana
 Temp. US 41 - Lincolnwood to Skokie, Illinois
 Temp. US 41 - Highland Park to Del Mar Woods, Illinois
 Toll US 41 - Lansing to Antioch, Illinois
 Temp. US 41 - Milwaukee, Wisconsin
 City US 41 - Fond du Lac, Wisconsin
 City US 41 - Oshkosh, Wisconsin
 Bus. US 41 - Appleton, Wisconsin
 Bus. US 41 - De Pere to Ashwaubenon, Wisconsin
 Bus. US 41 - Oconto, Wisconsin
 Bus. US 41 - Peshtigo, Wisconsin
 Bus. US 41 - Marquette, Michigan
 Alt. US 41 - Ishpeming to Negaunee, Michigan
 Bus. US 41 - Baraga, Michigan

US 42
 Alt. US 42 – Cincinnati to Sharonville, Ohio
 Bus. US 42 – Covington, Kentucky

US 43
 Alt. US 43 – Mobile to Chickasaw, Alabama
 Bus. US 43 – Tuscumbia, Alabama

US 44
 US 44A – Manchester to West Ashford, Connecticut

US 45
 Bus. US 45 – Shubuta, Mississippi
 Bus. US 45 – Meridian, Mississippi
 Alt. US 45 – Northeast of Brooksville to Shannon, Mississippi
 Bus. US 45 – south-southeast of Okolona to Shannon, Mississippi
 Bus. US 45 – Tupelo, Mississippi
 Alt. US 45 – Southwest of Medina, Tennessee,  to Fulton, Kentucky
 Byp. US 45 – Jackson, Tennessee
 Bus. US 45W- Humboldt, Tennessee
 Bus. US 45W – Trenton, Tennessee
 Bus. US 45E – Martin, Tennessee
 Byp. US 45 – Fulton, Kentucky
 Byp. US 45 – Mayfield, Kentucky
 Bus. US 45 – Paducah, Kentucky
 Byp. US 45 – Paducah, Kentucky
 Byp. US 45 – Norris City, Illinois
 Bus. US 45 – New London, Wisconsin
 Bus. US 45 – Wittenberg, Wisconsin

US 49

 Bus. US 49 – Hattiesburg, Mississippi
 Bus. US 49 – Bentonia, Mississippi
 Bus. US 49E – Greenwood, Mississippi
 US 49B – Helena–West Helena, Arkansas
 US 49B – Jonesboro, Arkansas
 US 49B – Brookland, Arkansas
 US 49B – Paragould, Arkansas
 US 49Y – Paragould, Arkansas

US 50

 Bus. US 50 - Oakland, California
 Bus. US 50 - Sacramento, California
 Alt. US 50 - signed, but unofficial, route between Pollock Pines and South Lake Tahoe, California
 Temp. US 50 - Carson City, Nevada
 Bus. US 50 - Carson City, Nevada
 Alt. US 50 - Silver Springs to Fallon, Nevada via Fernley
 Alt. US 50 - Fallon, Nevada
 Alt. US 50 - Ely, Nevada to Provo, Utah
 Temp. US 50 - Colton to Castle Gate, Utah
 Bus. US 50 - Pueblo to Avondale, Colorado
 Bus. US 50 - Olathe, Colorado
 Alt. US 50 - Garden City, Kansas
 Bus. US 50 - Garden City, Kansas
 Byp. US 50 - Garden City, Kansas
 Alt. US 50 - Dodge City, Kansas
 Bus. US 50 - Dodge City, Kansas
 Byp. US 50 - Dodge City, Kansas
 Bus. US 50 - Ottawa, Kansas
 Opt. US 50 - Olathe, Kansas to Lone Jack, Missouri
 Bus. US 50 - Warrensburg, Missouri
 Bus. US 50 - Knob Noster, Missouri
 Spur US 50 - Smithton, Missouri
 Bus. US 50 - California, Missouri
 Bus. US 50 - St. Martins, Missouri
 Bus. US 50 - Jefferson City, Missouri
 Bus. US 50 - Jefferson City, Missouri
 U.S. Route 50W - Union, Missouri
 Bus. US 50 - Brentwood to St. Louis, Missouri
 City US 50 - Brentwood to St. Louis, Missouri
 Byp. US 50 - Mehlville, Missouri to Fairview Heights, Illinois
 Truck US 50 - St. Louis, Missouri
 Alt. US 50 - Sumner to Lawrenceville, Illinois
 Bus. US 50 - Lawrenceville, Illinois
 Bus. US 50 - Vincennes, Indiana
 Bus. US 50 - Washington, Indiana
 Bus. US 50 - Bedford, Indiana
 Byp. US 50 - Cleves to Milford, Ohio
 Truck US 50 - Cincinnati, Ohio
 Alt. US 50 - Athens, Ohio to Ellenboro, West Virginia
 Bus. US 50 - Belpre, Ohio
 Bus. US 50 - Parkersburg, West Virginia
 Alt. US 50 - Washington, D.C.
 Byp. US 50 - Washington, D.C.
 Temp. US 50 - Washington, D.C. to Ardmore, Maryland
 Bus. US 50 - Salisbury, Maryland

US 51
 Bus. US 51 – Ponchatoula to Hammond, Louisiana
 Bus. US 51 – McComb, Mississippi
 Bus. US 51 – Crystal Springs, Mississippi
 Truck US 51 – Memphis, Tennessee
 Bus. US 51 – Dyersburg, Tennessee
 Byp. US 51 – Dyersburg, Tennessee
 Bus. US 51 – Elwin to Decatur, Illinois
 Bus. US 51 – Clinton, Illinois
 Bus. US 51 – Bloomington to Normal, Illinois
 Bus. US 51 – LaSalle, Illinois
 Spur US 51 – Beloit, Wisconsin
 Bus. US 51 – Plover to Stevens Point, Wisconsin
 Bus. US 51 – Rothschild to Wausau, Wisconsin
 Bus. US 51 – Merrill, Wisconsin
 Bus. US 51 – Tomahawk, Wisconsin

US 52

 Bus. US 52 - Minot, North Dakota
 Bus. US 52 - Harvey, North Dakota
 Bus. US 52 - Valley City, North Dakota
 Truck US 52 - Jamestown, North Dakota
 Alt. US 52 - Luxemburg to Dubuque, Iowa
 Bus. US 52 - Fowler, Indiana
 Bus. US 52 - Lafayette, Indiana
 Bus. US 52 - Hanging Rock to Coal Grove, Ohio
 Truck US 52 - Williamson, West Virginia to South Williamson, Kentucky
 Alt. US 52 - Welch, West Virginia
 Truck US 52 - Bluefield, West Virginia
 US 52A - Mount Airy, North Carolina
 Bus. US 52 - Mount Airy, North Carolina
 US 52A - Pilot Mountain, North Carolina
 Bus. US 52 - Pilot Mountain, North Carolina
 Byp. US 52 - Pilot Mountain, North Carolina
 Bus. US 52 - Albemarle, North Carolina
 Truck US 52 - Cheraw, South Carolina
 Bus. US 52 - Darlington, South Carolina
 Alt. US 52 - Florence, South Carolina
 Conn. US 52 - Florence, South Carolina
 Truck US 52 - Florence, South Carolina
 Alt. US 52 - Lake City, South Carolina
 Conn. US 52 - North Charleston, South Carolina
 Alt. US 52 - North Charleston to Charleston, South Carolina
 Alt. US 52 - Charleston, South Carolina
 Spur US 52 - Charleston, South Carolina

US 53
 Bus. US 53 - Eau Claire, Wisconsin
 Byp. US 53 - Eau Claire, Wisconsin
 Alt. US 53 - Lake Hallie to Chippewa Falls, Wisconsin
 Bus. US 53 - Minong, Wisconsin
 Bus. US 53 - Solon Springs, Wisconsin
 Bus. US 53 - Superior, Wisconsin
 Bus. US 53 - Virginia, Minnesota

US 54

 Bus. US 54 – El Paso, Texas to Texas/New Mexico state line
 Bus. US 54 – Alamogordo, New Mexico
 Bus. US 54 – Tucumcari, New Mexico
 Bus. US 54 – Lake Ozark, Missouri
 Bus. US 54 – Eldon, Missouri
 Alt. US 54 – Jefferson City, Missouri
 Bus. US 54 – Fulton, Missouri
 Bus. US 54 – Mexico, Missouri
 Bus. US 54 - Bowling Green, Missouri
 Bus. US 54 – Louisiana, Missouri
 City US 54 - Kankakee, Illinois
 Bus. US 54 – Kankakee, Illinois

US 56
 Temp. US 56 - Boise City, Oklahoma to Elkhart, Kansas
 Bus. US 56 - Herington, Kansas

US 58

 Bus. US 58 - Ewing to Rose Hill, Virginia
 Alt. US 58 - Jonesville to Abingdon, Virginia
 Bus. US 58 - Dryden, Virginia
 Alt. Bus. US 58 - Dryden, Virginia
 Alt. Bus. US 58 - Norton, Virginia
 Bus. US 58 - Gate City, Virginia
 Bus. US 58 - Hillsville, Virginia
 Bus. US 58 - west of Meadows of Dan, Virginia
 Bus. US 58 - Stuart, Virginia
 Bus. US 58 - Martinsville, Virginia
 Bus. US 58 - Danville, Virginia
 Bus. US 58 - Clarksville, Virginia
 Bus. US 58 - Boydton, Virginia
 Bus. US 58 - South Hill, Virginia
 Bus. US 58 - Lawrenceville, Virginia
 Bus. US 58 - Emporia, Virginia
 Bus. US 58 - Courtland, Virginia
 Bus. US 58 - Franklin to Carrsville, Virginia
 Bus. US 58 - Suffolk, Virginia
 Alt. US 58 - Portsmouth, Virginia
 Bus. US 58 - Virginia Beach, Virginia

US 59

 Bus. US 59 - Laredo, Texas
 Bus. US 59 - George West, Texas
 Bus. US 59 - Victoria to Telferner, Texas
 Bus. US 59 - El Campo, Texas
 Bus. US 59 - Wharton to Hungerford, Texas
 Alt. US 59 - Southside Place to Houston, Texas
 Bus. US 59 - Houston, Texas
 Bus. US 59 - Splendora, Texas
 Bus. US 59 - Livingston, Texas
 Bus. US 59 - Lufkin, Texas
 Bus. US 59 - Nacogdoches to Redfield, Texas
 Bus. US 59 - Carthage, Texas
 Bus. US 59 - Jefferson, Texas
 Temp. US 59 - Maud, Texas to Page, Oklahoma
 Bus. US 59 - Texarkana, Texas to Texarkana, Arkansas
 Byp. US 59 - Texarkana, Texas
 Byp. US 59 - Poteau, Oklahoma
 Alt. US 59 - Fort Smith, Arkansas to West Siloam Springs, Oklahoma
 Temp. US 59 - Fort Smith, Arkansas to West Siloam Springs, Oklahoma
 Bus. US 59 - Ottawa, Kansas
 Bus. US 59 - Industrial City to St. Joseph, Missouri
 City US 59 - Industrial City to St. Joseph, Missouri

US 60

 Bus. US 60 – Riverside, California
 Bus. US 60 – Banning, California
 Bus. US 60 – Superior, Arizona
 Temp. US 60 – Globe to Springerville, Arizona
 Truck US 60 – Globe, Arizona
 Bus. US 60 – Tonkawa, Oklahoma
 Bus. US 60 – Ponca City, Oklahoma
 City US 60 – Ponca City, Oklahoma
 Bus. US 60 – West Seneca, Oklahoma to Seneca, Missouri
 Bus. US 60 – Neosho, Missouri
 Bus. US 60 – Monett, Missouri
 Bus. US 60 – Verona to Aurora, Missouri
 Bus. US 60 – Springfield, Missouri
 City US 60 – Springfield, Missouri
 Bus. US 60 – Rogersville, Missouri
 Bus. US 60 – Mansfield, Missouri
 Bus. US 60 – Mountain Grove, Missouri
 Bus. US 60 – Cabool, Missouri
 Bus. US 60 – Willow Springs, Missouri
 Bus. US 60 – Van Buren, Missouri
 Bus. US 60 – Poplar Bluff, Missouri
 Bus. US 60 – Dexter, Missouri
 Bus. US 60 – Sikeston to Charleston, Missouri
 Bus. US 60 – Paducah, Kentucky
 City US 60 – Paducah, Kentucky
 Byp. US 60 – Morganfield, Kentucky
 Truck US 60 – Morganfield, Kentucky
 Bus. US 60 – Owensboro, Kentucky
 Byp. US 60 – Owensboro, Kentucky
 Bus. US 60 – Cloverport, Kentucky
 Alt. US 60 – Louisville, Kentucky
 Bus. US 60 – Louisville, Kentucky
 Truck US 60 – Louisville, Kentucky
 Bus. US 60 – Frankfort, Kentucky
 Bus. US 60 – Versailles, Kentucky
 Bus. US 60 – Lexington, Kentucky
 Byp. US 60 - Lexington, Kentucky
 Truck US 60 – Lexington, Kentucky
 Truck US 60 – Winchester, Kentucky
 Truck US 60 – Salt Lake to Midland, Kentucky
 Bus. US 60 – Ashland, Kentucky
 Truck US 60 – Charleston, West Virginia
 Bus. US 60 – Clifton Forge, Virginia
 Truck US 60 - Richmond, Virginia
 Bus. US 60 – Williamsburg, Virginia
 Bus. US 60 – Newport News, Virginia
 Alt. US 60 - Norfolk, Virginia

US 61

 Bus. US 61 - Baton Rouge, Louisiana
 Byp. US 61 - Baton Rouge, Louisiana
 Bus. US 61 - St. Francisville, Louisiana
 Bus. US 61 - Natchez, Mississippi
 Bus. US 61 - Port Gibson, Mississippi
 Bus. US 61 - Vicksburg, Mississippi
 Bus. US 61 - Leland, Mississippi
 Bus. US 61 - Merigold to Shelby, Mississippi
 Bus. US 61 - Blytheville, Arkansas
 Bus. US 61 - Holland to Steele, Missouri
 Spur US 61 - New Madrid, Missouri
 Bus. US 61 - Sikeston, Missouri
 Bus. US 61 - Cape Girardeau, Missouri
 City US 61 - Cape Girardeau, Missouri
 Bus. US 61 - Bowling Green, Missouri
 Spur US 61 - Bowling Green, Missouri
 Bus. US 61 - New London, Missouri
 Bus. US 61 - Hannibal, Missouri
 City US 61 - Hannibal, Missouri
 Bus. US 61 - Palmyra, Missouri
 Bus. US 61 - La Grange, Missouri
 Bus. US 61 - Canton, Missouri
 Bus. US 61 - Keokuk, Iowa
 Bus. US 61 - Jefferson Township to Washington Township, Iowa
 Bus. US 61 - Muscatine, Iowa
 Bus. US 61 - Davenport, Iowa
 Bus. US 61 - Maquoketa, Iowa

US 62

 Bus. US 62 - Snyder, Oklahoma
 Temp. US 62 - Lawton, Oklahoma
 Temp. US 62 - Oklahoma City, Oklahoma
 Bus. US 62 - Henryetta, Oklahoma
 Bus. US 62 - Muskogee, Oklahoma
 Bus. US 62 - Tahlequah, Oklahoma
 US 62B - Fayetteville, Arkansas
 US 62B - Rogers, Arkansas
 US 62B - Eureka Springs, Arkansas
 City US 62 - Eureka Springs, Arkansas
 US 62S - Berryville, Arkansas
 US 62S - Pyatt, Arkansas
 US 62B - Yellville, Arkansas
 US 62B - Cotter, Arkansas
 US 62B - Mountain Home, Arkansas
 US 62B - Prairie Grove, Arkansas
 US 62B - Salem, Arkansas
 City US 62 - Sikeston, Missouri
 Temp. US 62 - Dawson Springs to Nortonville, Kentucky
 Truck US 62 - Elizabethtown, Kentucky
 Truck US 62 - Lawrenceburg, Kentucky
 Bus. US 62 - Maysville, Kentucky
 Temp. US 62 - Alliance, Ohio
 Bus. US 62 - Sharon, Pennsylvania
 Byp. US 62 - Sharon, Pennsylvania
 Bus. US 62 - Niagara Falls, New York

US 63

 US 63S - Moro Bay, Arkansas
 US 63B - Hermitage, Arkansas
 US 63B - Warren, Arkansas
 US 63B - Pine Bluff, Arkansas
 US 63S - Hazen, Arkansas
 US 63B - Marked Tree, Arkansas
 US 63C - Trumann, Arkansas
 US 63B - Jonesboro, Arkansas
 US 63B - Bono, Arkansas
 US 63B - Hoxie, Arkansas
 US 63B - Hardy, Arkansas
 Bus. US 63 - Thayer, Missouri
 Bus. US 63 - West Plains, Missouri
 Bus. US 63 - Willow Springs, Missouri
 Bus. US 63 - Cabool, Missouri
 Bus. US 63 - Columbia, Missouri
 Conn. US 63 - Columbia, Missouri
 Spur US 63 - Columbia, Missouri
 Bus. US 63 - Renick to Moberly, Missouri
 Bus. US 63 - Kirksville, Missouri
 City US 63 - Kirksville, Missouri
 Bus. US 63 - Ottumwa, Iowa
 Bus. US 63 - New Hampton, Iowa

US 64

 Bus. US 64 - Farmington, New Mexico
 Bus. US 64 - Enid, Oklahoma
 Bus. US 64 - Muskogee, Oklahoma
 US 64B - Alma, Arkansas
 City US 64 - Alma, Arkansas
 US 64B - Vilonia, Arkansas
 US 64B - Beebe, Arkansas
 City US 64 - Beebe, Arkansas
 US 64B - Augusta, Arkansas
 US 64B - Patterson to McCrory, Arkansas
 US 64B - Wynne, Arkansas
 City US 64 - Wynne, Arkansas
 US 64S - Wynne, Arkansas
 US 64B - Parkin, Arkansas
 US 64B - Earle, Arkansas
 US 64B - Crawfordsville, Arkansas
 Bus. US 64 - Whiteville, Tennessee
 Bus. US 64 - Selmer, Tennessee
 Truck US 64 - Savannah, Tennessee
 Byp. US 64 - Waynesboro, Tennessee
 Bus. US 64 - Lawrenceburg, Tennessee
 Bus. US 64 - Pulaski, Tennessee
 Bus. US 64 - Fayetteville, Tennessee
 Byp. US 64 - Fayetteville, Tennessee
 Bus. US 64 - Winchester to Monteagle, Tennessee
 Bus. US 64 - Chattanooga, Tennessee
 Byp. US 64 - Cleveland, Tennessee
 Alt. US 64 - southeast of Murphy, North Carolina
 Bus. US 64 - Hayesville, North Carolina
 Truck US 64 - Franklin, North Carolina to Hendersonville, North Carolina
 Bus. US 64 - Rosman, North Carolina
 US 64A - Brevard, North Carolina
 Bus. US 64 (1960–1980) - Brevard, North Carolina
 Bus. US 64 (2006–) - Brevard, North Carolina
 US 64A - Bat Cave to Morganton, North Carolina
 Bus. US 64 - Morganton, North Carolina
 Byp. US 64 - Morganton, North Carolina
 Truck US 64 - Morganton, North Carolina
 US 64A - Statesville, North Carolina
 Bus. US 64 - Statesville, North Carolina
 Bus. US 64 - Asheboro, North Carolina
 US 64A - Franklinville to Ramseur, North Carolina
 US 64A - Siler City, North Carolina
 Bus. US 64 - Pittsboro, North Carolina
 Bus. US 64 - Raleigh, North Carolina
 Bus. US 64 - Raleigh to Zebulon, North Carolina
 Alt. US 64 - Spring Hope to Nashville, North Carolina
 Bus. US 64 - Nashville, North Carolina
 US 64A - Rocky Mount, North Carolina
 Alt. US 64 - Rocky Mount to Tarboro, North Carolina
 Bus. US 64 - Rocky Mount, North Carolina
 Bus. US 64 - Tarboro to Princeville, North Carolina
 Alt. US 64 - Princeville to Williamston, North Carolina
 US 64A - Williamston, North Carolina
 Bus. US 64 - Williamston, North Carolina
 Bus. US 64 - Jamesville, North Carolina
 Alt. US 64 - Roper, North Carolina
 US 64A - Columbia, North Carolina
 Bus. US 64 - Columbia, North Carolina
 Byp. US 64 - Manns Harbor to Manteo, North Carolina

US 65

 Byp. US 65 – Baton Rouge, Louisiana
 US 65B – Pine Bluff, Arkansas
 City US 65 – Pine Bluff, Arkansas
 US 65S – Pine Bluff, Arkansas
 US 65B – Conway, Arkansas
 US 65B – Clinton, Arkansas
 US 65B – Western Grove, Arkansas
 US 65B – Harrison, Arkansas
 Spur US 65 – Tina, Missouri
 Bus. US 65 – Point Lookout to Branson, Missouri
 Bus. US 65 – Ozark, Missouri
 Bus. US 65 – Springfield, Missouri
 Byp. US 65 – Springfield, Missouri
 Spur US 65 – Warsaw, Missouri
 Bus. US 65 – Marshall, Missouri
 Bus. US 65 – Carrollton, Missouri
 Bus. US 65 – Trenton, Missouri
 City US 65 – Trenton, Missouri

US 66

 Alt. US 66 - Los Angeles to Pasadena, California
 Bus. US 66 - San Bernardino, California
 City US 66 - San Bernardino, California
 Bus. US 66 - Flagstaff, Arizona
 Bus. US 66 - Amarillo, Texas
 City US 66 - Amarillo, Texas
 Bus. US 66 - Clinton, Oklahoma
 City US 66 - Clinton, Oklahoma
 Alt. US 66 - Oklahoma City, Oklahoma
 Bus. US 66 - Oklahoma City, Oklahoma
 City US 66 - Oklahoma City, Oklahoma
 Bus. US 66 - Tulsa, Oklahoma
 Byp. US 66 - Tulsa, Oklahoma
 Alt. US 66 - Joplin, Missouri
 Bus. US 66 - Joplin, Missouri
 Byp. US 66 - Joplin, Missouri
 Alt. US 66 - Joplin to Webb City, Missouri
 Bus. US 66 - Webb City to Carterville, Missouri
 Alt. US 66 - Carthage to Kendricktown, Missouri
 Bus. US 66 - Carthage, Missouri
 Alt. Bus. US 66 - Springfield, Missouri
 Bus. US 66 - Springfield, Missouri
 Byp. US 66 - Springfield, Missouri
 City US 66 - Springfield, Missouri
 Bus. US 66 - Lebanon, Missouri
 Bus. US 66 - Waynesville, Missouri
 Spur US 66 - Fort Leonard Wood, Missouri
 Bus. US 66 - Rolla, Missouri
 City US 66 - Rolla, Missouri
 Bus. US 66 - Pacific, Missouri
 Bus. US 66 - St. Louis to Sunset Hills, Missouri
 Byp. US 66 - St. Louis to Sunset Hills, Missouri
 Opt. US 66 - St. Louis, Missouri to Venice, Illinois
 City US 66 - St. Louis, Missouri to Mitchell, Illinois
 City US 66 - Kirkwood to Bellefontaine Neighbors, Missouri
 Bus. US 66 - East St. Louis to Mitchell, Illinois
 Temp. US 66 - Livingston to Springfield, Illinois
 Bus. US 66 - Springfield, Illinois
 City US 66 - Springfield, Illinois
 Bus. US 66 - Lincoln, Illinois
 City US 66 - Lincoln, Illinois
 Bus. US 66 - Bloomington, Illinois
 City US 66 - Bloomington, Illinois
 Alt. US 66 - Gardner to Bolingbrook, Illinois
 Alt. US 66 - Joliet, Illinois

US 67

 Bus. US 67 - Presidio, Texas
 Bus. US 67 - San Angelo, Texas (west)
 Bus. US 67 - San Angelo, Texas (east)
 Bus. US 67 - Dublin, Texas
 Bus. US 67 - Stephenville, Texas
 Bus. US 67 - Cleburne, Texas
 Bus. US 67 - Alvarado, Texas
 Bus. US 67 - Midlothian, Texas
 Bus. US 67 - Dallas, Texas
 Bus. US 67 - Greenville, Texas
 Bus. US 67 - Sulphur Springs, Texas
 US 67B - Beebe, Arkansas
 US 67B - Searcy, Arkansas
 City US 67 - Searcy, Arkansas
 City US 67 - Judsonia, Arkansas
 US 67B - Hoxie to Walnut Ridge, Arkansas
 US 67C - Walnut Ridge, Arkansas
 US 67B - Pocahontas, Arkansas
 US 67B - Biggers, Arkansas
 US 67S - Biggers, Arkansas
 US 67B - Reyno, Arkansas
 US 67B - Datto, Arkansas
 US 67S - Datto, Arkansas
 Bus. US 67 - Poplar Bluff, Missouri
 Bus. US 67 - Greenville, Missouri
 Bus. US 67 - Fredericktown, Missouri
 Bus. US 67 - Leadington to Park Hills, Missouri
 Alt. US 67 - Mehlville, Missouri to Alton, Illinois
 Byp. US 67 - Mehlville, Missouri to Alton, Illinois
 Byp. US 67 - Mehlville to Bellefontaine, Missouri
 Alt. US 67 - Godfrey to Murrayville, Illinois
 Bus. US 67 - Jacksonville, Illinois
 Bus. US 67 - Roseville, Illinois
 Byp. US 67 - Roseville, Illinois
 Alt. US 67 - Riverdale to Le Claire, Iowa

US 68

 Bus. US 68 – Cadiz, Kentucky
 Byp. US 68 – Hopkinsville, Kentucky
 Truck US 68 - Hopkinsville, Kentucky
 Alt. US 68 – Fairview, Kentucky
 Bus. US 68 – Elkton, Kentucky
 Bus. US 68 – Russellville, Kentucky
 Bus. US 68 – Auburn, Kentucky
 Alt. US 68 – Bowling Green, Kentucky
 Bus. US 68 – Bowling Green, Kentucky
 Bus. US 68 – Glasgow, Kentucky
 Truck US 68 - Glasgow, Kentucky
 Bus. US 68 – Lexington, Kentucky
 Bus. US 68 – Paris, Kentucky
 Byp. US 68 – Paris, Kentucky
 Alt. US 68 – Maysville, Kentucky to Aberdeen, Ohio
 Bus. US 68 – Maysville, Kentucky to Aberdeen, Ohio
 Byp. US 68 – Springfield, Ohio

US 69
 Bus. US 69 - Lufkin, Texas
 Bus. US 69 - Greenville, Texas
 Bus. US 69 - Trenton, Texas
 Bus. US 69 - Durant, Oklahoma
 Bus. US 69 - McAlester, Oklahoma
 Bus. US 69 - Eufaula, Oklahoma
 Bus. US 69 - Checotah, Oklahoma
 Bus. US 69 - Vinita, Oklahoma
 Bus. US 69 - Miami, Oklahoma
 City US 69 - Commerce, Oklahoma
 Alt. US 69 - south of Picher, Oklahoma to north of Crestline, Kansas
 Bus. US 69 - Baxter Springs, Kansas
 Bus. US 69 - Columbus, Kansas
 Bus. US 69 - Pittsburg, Kansas
 Bus. US 69 - Frontenac, Kansas
 Bus. US 69 - Franklin to Arma, Kansas
 Bus. US 69 - Fort Scott, Kansas
 Bus. US 69 - Overland Park, Kansas
 Bus. US 69 - Excelsior Springs, Missouri
 Spur US 69 - Bethany, Missouri

US 70

 Bus. US 70 - Pomona, California
 Bus. US 70 - Banning, California
 Bus. US 70 - Superior, Arizona
 Bus. US 70 - Alamogordo, New Mexico
 Bus. US 70 - Ruidoso, New Mexico
 Truck US 70 - Roswell, New Mexico
 Bus. US 70 - Portales, New Mexico
 Alt. US 70 - Wilson, Oklahoma
 City US 70 - Wilson, Oklahoma
 Byp. US 70 - Durant, Oklahoma
 Truck US 70 - Durant, Oklahoma
 Bus. US 70 - Hugo, Oklahoma
 Byp. US 70 - Idabel, Oklahoma
 US 70B - De Queen, Arkansas
 Temp. US 70 - Lockesburg to Kirby, Arkansas
 US 70B - Glenwood, Arkansas
 US 70B - Hot Springs, Arkansas
 City US 70 - Hot Springs, Arkansas
 City US 70 - Benton, Arkansas
 US 70B - Little Rock to North Little Rock, Arkansas
 US 70A - Brownsville to Huntingdon, Tennessee
 Byp. US 70A - Humboldt, Tennessee
 Bus. US 70 - Huntingdon, Tennessee
 Bus. US 70 - Camden, Tennessee
 Bus. US 70 - Dickson, Tennessee
 Bus. US 70 - Lebanon, Tennessee
 Bus. US 70S - McMinnville, Tennessee
 Bus. US 70 - Marshall, North Carolina
 US 70A - Morganton, North Carolina
 Bus. US 70 - Morganton, North Carolina
 US 70A (1946–1948) - Hildebran to Conover, North Carolina
 US 70A (1948–1957) - Hildebran to Conover
 US 70A - Salisbury, North Carolina
 US 70A - Lexington, North Carolina
 Bus. US 70 - Lexington, North Carolina
 Bus. US 70 - Thomasville, North Carolina
 US 70A - High Point to Greensboro, North Carolina
 US 70A (1934–1948) - High Point, North Carolina
 US 70A (1948–1957) - High Point, North Carolina
 US 70A - Greensboro, North Carolina
 US 70A (1942–1948) - Hillsborough, North Carolina
 US 70A (1948–1960) - Hillsborough, North Carolina
 Bus. US 70 - Hillsborough, North Carolina
 US 70A - Durham to Raleigh, North Carolina
 US 70A - Durham, North Carolina
 Bus. US 70 - Durham, North Carolina
 Bus. US 70 - Garner, North Carolina
 Bus. US 70 - Clayton to Smithfield, North Carolina
 US 70A - Smithfield, North Carolina
 Byp. US 70 - Selma, North Carolina
 US 70A - Selma to near Princeton, North Carolina, via Pine Level
 US 70A - Goldsboro, North Carolina
 Bus. US 70 - Goldsboro, North Carolina
 Byp. US 70 - Goldsboro, North Carolina
 US 70A - Kinston, North Carolina
 Bus. US 70 - Kinston, North Carolina
 Bus. US 70 - New Bern, North Carolina
 Bus. US 70 - Beaufort, North Carolina

US 71

 Bus. US 71 – Alexandria, Louisiana
 Byp. US 71 – Alexandria, Louisiana
 US 71B – Waldron, Arkansas
 US 71B – Fort Smith to Alma, Arkansas
 US 71B – Fayetteville to Bentonville, Arkansas
 US 71S – Fayetteville, Arkansas
 US 71B – Bentonville, Arkansas
 City US 71 – Bentonville, Arkansas
 Temp. US 71 – Bentonville, Arkansas to Lanagan, Missouri
 Byp. US 71 - Douglas County, MO to Bella Vista, AR
 Alt. US 71 – Pineville to Anderson, Missouri
 Bus. US 71 – Neosho, Missouri
 Alt. US 71 – Neosho to Carthage, Missouri
 Opt. US 71 – Neosho to Carthage, Missouri
 Bus. US 71 – Saginaw to Webb City, Missouri, via Joplin
 Spur US 71 – Milo, Missouri
 Bus. US 71 – Nevada, Missouri
 Bus. US 71 – Butler to Passaic, Missouri
 Bus. US 71 – Kansas City, Missouri
 City US 71 – Kansas City, Missouri
 Byp. US 71 – Harrisonville to Ferrelview, Missouri, via Kansas City, Missouri
 Byp. US 71 – Tracy, Missouri
 Byp. US 71 – Platte City, Missouri
 City US 71 – Faucett to St. Joseph, Missouri
 Bus. US 71 – St. Joseph to Savannah, Missouri
 Bus. US 71 – Maryville, Missouri
 Bus. US 71 – Clarinda, Iowa
 Bus. US 71 – Storm Lake, Iowa
 Bus. US 71 – Willmar, Minnesota
 Byp. US 71 – Willmar, Minnesota

US 72
 Bus. US 72 – Tuscumbia, Alabama
 Alt. US 72 – Muscle Shoals to Huntsville, Alabama
 Bus. US 72 – Athens, Alabama
 Bus. US 72 – Scottsboro, Alabama

US 73
 Alt. US 73 – Kansas City, Kansas
 Truck US 73 – Leavenworth, Kansas

US 74

 US 74A - Asheville to Forest City, North Carolina
 US 74A - Rutherfordton, North Carolina
 Bus. US 74 - Rutherfordton to Mooresboro, North Carolina, via Forest City
 US 74A - Shelby, North Carolina
 Bus. US 74 - Shelby, North Carolina
 Byp. US 74 - Shelby, North Carolina
 Bus. US 74 - Kings Mountain, North Carolina
 US 74A - Bessemer City, North Carolina
 Byp. US 74 - Stallings to Wingate, North Carolina
 US 74A (1949–1952) - Monroe, North Carolina
 US 74A (1952–1954) - Monroe, North Carolina
 US 74A - Rockingham, North Carolina
 Bus. US 74 - Rockingham to Hamlet, North Carolina
 Bus. US 74 - Laurinburg to Maxton, North Carolina
 Alt. US 74 - Maxton to Lumberton, North Carolina
 Bus. US 74 - Chadbourn to Whiteville, North Carolina
 Temp. US 74 - Chadbourn, North Carolina
 US 74A - Leland, North Carolina
 US 74A - Wrightsville Beach, North Carolina

US 75

 Temp. US 75 - Galveston to Houston, Texas
 Bus. US 75 - Houston, Texas
 Bus. US 75 - Sherman to Denison, Texas
 Bus. US 75 - Durant, Oklahoma
 Bus. US 75 - Henryetta, Oklahoma
 Alt. US 75 - Beggs to Sapulpa, Oklahoma
 Temp. US 75 - Oakhurst to Owasso, Oklahoma
 Temp. US 75 - Oakhurst to Owasso, Oklahoma
 Bus. US 75 - Tulsa, Oklahoma
 Bus. US 75 - Altoona, Kansas
 Alt. US 75 - Wakarusa to North Topeka, Kansas
 Bus. US 75 - Topeka, Kansas
 Byp. US 75 - Topeka, Kansas
 Alt. US 75 - North Topeka to Hoyt, Kansas
 Bus. US 75 - Nebraska City, Nebraska
 Bus. US 75 - Sioux City, Iowa
 Bus. US 75 - Le Mars, Iowa

US 76

 Bus. US 76 – Dalton, Georgia
 Truck US 76 – Ringgold, Georgia
 Alt. US 76 – Long Creek, South Carolina
 Bus. US 76 – Seneca, South Carolina
 Bus. US 76 – Laurens, South Carolina
 Bus. US 76 – Newberry, South Carolina
 Byp. US 76 – Newberry, South Carolina
 Alt. US 76 – Columbia, South Carolina
 Conn. US 76 – Columbia, South Carolina
 Bus. US 76 – Sumter, South Carolina
 Byp. US 76 – Sumter, South Carolina
 Alt. US 76 – Mayesville, South Carolina
 Alt. US 76 – Florence County, South Carolina
 Conn. US 76 – Florence, South Carolina
 Alt. US 76 – Marion, South Carolina
 Bus. US 76 – Chadbourn to Whiteville, North Carolina
 Temp. US 76 - Chadbourn, North Carolina

US 77
 Bus. US 77 – Brownsville, Texas
 Bus. US 77 – Harlingen, Texas
 Bus. US 77 – Sebastian to Raymondville, Texas
 Bus. US 77 – Kingsville to Bishop, Texas
 Bus. US 77 – Robstown, Texas
 Bus. US 77 – Sinton, Texas
 Alt. US 77 – Refugio to Hallettsville, Texas
 Bus. US 77 – Victoria, Texas
 Alt. Bus. US 77 – Yoakum, Texas
 Bus. US 77 – Waco to Lacy Lakeview, Texas
 Bus. US 77 – Dallas
 Bus. US 77 – Ardmore, Oklahoma
 Alt. US 77 – Oklahoma City, Oklahoma
 Bus. US 77 – Perry, Oklahoma
 Alt. US 77 – Ponca City, Oklahoma
 Bus. US 77 – Ponca City, Oklahoma
 City US 77 – Ponca City, Oklahoma
 Bus. US 77 – Arkansas City, Kansas
 Byp. US 77 – Arkansas City, Kansas
 Truck US 77 – Arkansas City, Kansas
 Bus. US 77 – Herington, Kansas
 Bus. US 77 – Junction City, Kansas

US 78

 Bus. US 78 – Red Banks, Mississippi
 Bus. US 78 – Hickory Flat, Mississippi
 Alt. US 78 – Hamilton to Graysville, Alabama
 Alt. US 78 – Carbon Hill to Jasper, Alabama
 Alt. US 78 – Birmingham to Irondale, Alabama
 Truck US 78 – Birmingham, Alabama
 Truck US 78 – Leeds, Alabama
 Bus. US 78 – Anniston, Alabama
 Alt. US 78 – Heflin, Alabama,  to Villa Rica, Georgia
 Bus. US 78 – Athens, Georgia
 Bus. US 78 – Washington, Georgia
 Alt. US 78 – Aiken, South Carolina
 Truck US 78 – Aiken, South Carolina
 Alt. US 78 – Williston, South Carolina
 Conn. US 78 – Blackville, South Carolina
 Bus. US 78 – Blackville, South Carolina
 Conn. US 78 - Southwest of Branchville, South Carolina

US 79

 Bus. US 79 – Austin, Texas
 Bus. US 79 – Taylor, Texas
 Bus. US 79 – Henderson, Texas
 Bus. US 79 – Carthage, Texas
 Truck US 79 – Minden, Louisiana
 Byp. US 79 – Homer, Louisiana
 US 79B – Magnolia, Arkansas
 US 79C – McNeil, Arkansas
 US 79B – Camden, Arkansas
 US 79B – Bearden, Arkansas
 Alt. US 79 – Thornton to Fordyce, Arkansas
 US 79B – Thornton, Arkansas
 US 79B – Fordyce, Arkansas
 US 79B – Pine Bluff to Altheimer, Arkansas
 US 79B – Stuttgart, Arkansas
 US 79C – Stuttgart, Arkansas
 Bus. US 79 – Clarendon, Arkansas
 Bus. US 79 – Brownsville, Tennessee
 Byp. US 79 – Humboldt, Tennessee

US 80

 Bus. US 80 - San Diego, California
 Bus. US 80 - Winterhaven, California to Yuma, Arizona
 Alt. US 80 - Phoenix, Arizona
 Alt. US 80 - Phoenix, Arizona
 Byp. US 80 - Phoenix, Arizona
 Bus. US 80 - Tucson, Arizona
 Truck US 80 - Tombstone, Arizona
 Temp. US 80 - Sierra Vista to Bisbee, Arizona
 Alt. US 80 - Las Cruces to Anthony, New Mexico
 Alt. US 80 - El Paso, Texas
 Bus. US 80 - El Paso, Texas
 Bus. US 80 - Sierra Blanca, Texas
 Bus. US 80 - Van Horn, Texas
 Bus. US 80 - Odessa to Midland, Texas
 Bus. US 80 - Big Spring, Texas
 Bus. US 80 - Colorado City, Texas
 Bus. US 80 - Sweetwater, Texas
 Alt. US 80 - Abilene to Weatherford, Texas
 Bus. US 80 - Abilene, Texas
 Bus. US 80 - Fort Worth, Texas
 Bus. US 80 - Dallas, Texas
 Truck US 80 - Minden, Louisiana
 Truck US 80 - Gibsland, Louisiana
 Truck US 80 - Arcadia, Louisiana
 Bus. US 80 - Meridian, Mississippi
 Bus. US 80 - Selma, Alabama
 Truck US 80 - Selma, Alabama
 Bus. US 80 - Montgomery, Alabama
 Temp. US 80 - Columbus to Crystal Valley, Georgia
 Toll US 80 - Savannah to Whitemarsh Island, Georgia

US 81

 Bus. US 81 - Lytle, Texas
 Bus. US 81 - San Antonio, Texas (split into two pieces)
 Bus. US 81 - Austin, Texas
 Bus. US 81 - Waco, Texas
 Alt. US 81 - Fort Worth, Texas
 Bus. US 81 - Fort Worth, Texas
 Bus. US 81 - Rhome, Texas
 Bus. US 81 - Decatur, Texas
 Bus. US 81 - Alvord, Texas
 Alt. US 81 - Waurika, Oklahoma
 City US 81 - Duncan, Oklahoma
 Bus. US 81 - Rush Springs, Oklahoma
 Byp. US 81 - Wichita, Kansas
 Truck US 81 - Wichita, Kansas
 Bus. US 81 - McPherson, Kansas
 Byp. US 81 - McPherson, Kansas – now K-153, but county-installed street signs still reference Byp. US 81.
 Bus. US 81 - Lindsborg, Kansas
 Alt. US 81 - Salina to Minneapolis, Kansas
 City US 81 - Salina, Kansas
 Bus. US 81 - Fargo, North Dakota
 Bus. US 81 - Grand Forks, North Dakota

US 82

 Truck US 82 - Artesia, New Mexico
 Truck US 82 - Lovington, New Mexico
 Bus. US 82 - Wolfforth, Texas
 Bus. US 82 - Holliday, Texas
 Bus. US 82 - Wichita Falls, Texas
 Bus. US 82 - Paris, Texas
 Bus. US 82 - Clarksville, Texas
 Bus. US 82 - Avery, Texas
 US 82T - Stamps, Arkansas
 US 82B - Magnolia, Arkansas
 US 82B - El Dorado, Arkansas
 US 82S - Felsenthal National Wildlife Refuge in Ashley County, Arkansas
 US 82B - Montrose, Arkansas
 US 82S - Montrose, Arkansas
 Bus. US 82 - Eupora, Mississippi
 Byp. US 82 - Tuscaloosa, Alabama
 Alt. US 82 - Montgomery to Prattville, Alabama
 Bus. US 82 - Montgomery, Alabama
 Byp. US 82 (1961–1965) - Montgomery, Alabama
 Byp. US 82 (1965–1975) - Montgomery, Alabama
 City US 82 - Montgomery, Alabama
 Truck US 82 - Montgomery, Alabama
 Bus. US 82 - Albany, Georgia

US 83

 Bus. US 83 – Harlingen to Peñitas, Texas, via McAllen, Texas
 Bus. US 83 – San Ygnacio, Texas
 Bus. US 83 – Laredo, Texas
 Temp. US 83 – Uvalde to Junction, Texas
 Temp. US 83 – Big Paint to Junction, Texas
 Bus. US 83 – Abilene, Texas
 Bus. US 83 – Garden City, Kansas
 Spur US 83 – Garden City, Kansas
 Byp. US 83 – Oakley, Kansas
 Bus. US 83 – Pierre, South Dakota
 Byp. US 83 – Pierre, South Dakota
 Bus. US 83 – Minot, North Dakota
 Byp. US 83 – Minot, North Dakota

US 84

 Bus. US 84 – Slaton, Texas
 Bus. US 84 – Snyder, Texas
 Bus. US 84 – Hermleigh, Texas
 Bus. US 84 – Roscoe, Texas
 Bus. US 84 – Abilene, Texas
 Bus. US 84 – Waco, Texas
 Bus. US 84 – Teague, Texas
 Bus. US 84 – Natchez, Mississippi
 Bus. US 84 – Enterprise, Alabama
 Truck US 84 – Enterprise, Alabama
 Bus. US 84 – Dothan, Alabama
 Bus. US 84 – Bainbridge, Georgia
 Bus. US 84 – Thomasville, Georgia

US 85

 Bus. US 85 – El Paso, Texas
 Alt. US 85 – Anthony to Las Cruces, New Mexico
 Byp. US 85 – Santa Fe, New Mexico
 Alt. US 85 – Barelas to Alameda, New Mexico
 Byp. US 85 – Fountain to Colorado Springs, Colorado
 Bus. US 85 – Brighton, Colorado
 Bus. US 85 – Fort Lupton, Colorado
 Bus. US 85 – Platteville, Colorado
 Bus. US 85 – Greeley, Colorado
 Alt. US 85 – Mule Creek Junction, Wyoming to Lead, South Dakota
 Truck US 85 – Lead to Deadwood, South Dakota
 Byp. US 85 – Pierre, South Dakota
 Bus. US 85 - Watford City, North Dakota
 Bus. US 85 - Alexander, North Dakota
 Bus. US 85 – Williston, North Dakota
 US 85B – Williams County, North Dakota

US 87

 Bus. US 87 - Stockdale, Texas
 Bus. US 87 - San Antonio, Texas
 Bus. US 87 - Big Spring, Texas
 Bus. US 87 - Lamesa, Texas
 Bus. US 87 - Woodrow, Texas
 Bus. US 87 - Lubbock, Texas
 Bus. US 87 - New Deal, Texas
 Bus. US 87 - Plainview, Texas
 Bus. US 87 - Dalhart, Texas
 Temp. US 87 - Denver, Colorado
 Bus. US 87 - Cheyenne, Wyoming
 Bus. US 87 - Wheatland, Wyoming
 Bus. US 87 - Douglas, Wyoming
 Bus. US 87 - Casper, Wyoming
 Bus. US 87 - Buffalo, Wyoming
 Bus. US 87 - Sheridan, Wyoming
 Byp. US 87 - Great Falls, Montana
 Byp. US 87 - Lewistown, Montana

US 89
 Bus. US 89 – Florence, Arizona
 US 89A – Prescott, Arizona
 US 89A – Prescott to Flagstaff, Arizona
 Spur US 89A – Prescott, Arizona
 Temp. US 89 – Prescott, Arizona
 Truck US 89 – Prescott, Arizona
 Spur US 89 – Flagstaff, Arizona
 Temp. US 89 – Cameron to Cedar Ridge, Arizona
 Truck US 89 – Cameron, Arizona
 US 89T – Northwest of Tuba City to Page, Arizona
 Bus. US 89 – Page, Arizona
 Spur US 89 – Page, Arizona
 US 89A – Bitter Springs, Arizona to Kanab, Utah
 US 89A – Salt Lake City
 US 89A – North Salt Lake to Farmington, Utah
 Temp. US 89 – Garden City, Utah to Hoback, Wyoming
 Byp. US 89 – Great Falls, Montana

US 90

 Alt. US 90 - Seguin to Houston, Texas
 Bus. US 90 - Houston to Barrett, Texas
 Bus. US 90 - Beaumont, Texas
 Bus. US 90 - Orange to Pinehurst, Texas
 Bus. US 90 - Lake Charles, Louisiana
 Bus. US 90 - Lafayette, Louisiana
 Bus. US 90 - Morgan City to Amelia, Louisiana
 Bus. US 90 - Avondale to New Orleans, Louisiana
 Alt. US 90 - Prichard to Mobile, Alabama
 Truck US 90 - Mobile, Alabama
 Alt. US 90 - northwest of Pensacola to Ferry Pass, Florida
 Alt. US 90 - Quincy to Tallahassee, Florida
 Alt. US 90 - Jacksonville, Florida

US 91
 Bus. US 91 – Corona to Riverside, California
 Bus. US 91 – Colton to San Bernardino, California
 Bus. US 91 – Victorville, California
 Alt. US 91 – Jean to Las Vegas, Nevada
 Alt. US 91 – Salt Lake City, Utah
 Alt. US 91 – North Salt Lake to Farmington, Utah
 Alt. US 91 – North Salt Lake to Ogden, Utah
 Bus. US 91 – McCammon, Idaho
 Bus. US 91 – Inkom, Idaho
 Bus. US 91 – Pocatello, Idaho
 Bus. US 91 – Blackfoot, Idaho
 Bus. US 91 – Idaho Falls, Idaho
 Byp. US 91 – Butte, Montana
 Bus. US 91 – Helena, Montana

US 92

 Bus. US 92 - Lakeland, Florida
 Truck US 92 - Kissimmee, Florida
 Truck US 92 - Winter Park to Maitland, Florida

US 93
 Spur US 93 - Kingman, Arizona
 Alt. US 93 - Kingman, Arizona
 Truck US 93 - Kingman, Arizona to Boulder City, Nevada
 Bus. US 93 - Boulder City, Nevada
 Truck US 93 - Boulder City, Nevada
 Alt. US 93 - Lages Station to Wells, Nevada, via West Wendover
 Alt. Bus. US 93 - West Wendover, Nevada
 Alt. US 93 - Shoshone to Challis, Idaho, via Arco
 Alt. US 93 - Kalispell, Montana

US 95

 Truck US 95 - San Luis, Arizona
 Spur US 95 - Parker, Arizona
 Alt. US 95 - Las Vegas, Nevada
 Bus. US 95 - Las Vegas, Nevada
 Truck US 95 - Hawthorne, Nevada
 Spur US 95 - Fernley, Nevada
 Alt. US 95 - Schurz to north of Fallon, Nevada via Yerington, Silver Springs, and Fernley, Nevada
 Spur US 95 - Payette, Idaho
 Spur US 95 – Weiser Junction, Oregon to Weiser, Idaho
 Bus. US 95 - Cottonwood, Idaho
 Bus. US 95 - Craigmont, Idaho
 Bus. US 95 - Winchester, Idaho
 Spur US 95 - Lewiston, Idaho
 Bus. US 95 - Potlatch to St. Maries, Idaho
 Alt. US 95 - Potlach to Wolf Lodge, Idaho, via St. Maries
 Bus. US 95 - Bonners Ferry, Idaho

US 96
 Bus. US 96 – Silsbee, Texas
 Bus. US 96 – Buna, Texas

US 97
 Bus. US 97 - Klamath Falls, Oregon
 Bus. US 97 - Bend, Oregon
 Bus. US 97 - Redmond, Oregon
 Alt. US 97 - Toppenish to Union Gap, Washington
 Bus. US 97 - Cashmere, Washington
 Alt. US 97 - Wenatchee to Chelan, Washington
 Spur US 97 - Orondo, Washington
 Bus. US 97 - Okanogan to Omak, Washington

US 98

 Bus. US 98 – Natchez, Mississippi
 Bus. US 98 – Summit to McComb, Mississippi
 Truck US 98 – Mobile, Alabama
 Truck US 98 – Spanish Fort, Alabama
 Alt. US 98 – Fairhope to Barnwell, Alabama
 Alt. US 98 – Pensacola, Florida
 Bus. US 98 – Pensacola, Florida
 Toll US 98 – Pensacola to Navarre, Florida
 Alt. US 98 – Panama City Beach, Florida – now only State Road 30
 Byp. US 98 – Panama City Beach, Florida
 Bus. US 98 – Panama City to Parker, Florida
 Temp. US 98 – Wakulla to Perry, Florida
 Truck US 98 – Brooksville, Florida
 Bus. US 98 – Dade City, Florida
 Truck US 98 – Dade City, Florida
 Bus. US 98 – Lakeland, Florida
 Bus. US 98 – Bartow, Florida
 Temp. US 98 – Okeechobee to West Palm Beach, Florida

US 99

 Bus. US 99 – Banning, California
 Bus. US 99 – Pomona, California
 Bus. US 99 – Elysian Park to Sylmar, California
 Bus. US 99 – Fresno, California
 Bus. US 99 – Merced, California
 Bus. US 99 – Atwater, California
 Alt. US 99 – Sacramento to Red Bluff, California
 Bus. US 99 – Sacramento, California
 Bus. US 99 – Gold Hill, Oregon
 Bus. US 99 – Green, Oregon
 Bus. US 99 – Roseburg, Oregon
 Alt. US 99 – Junction City to Portland, Oregon
 Bus. US 99 – Salem, Oregon
 Byp. US 99 – Salem, Oregon
 US 99T – Tukwila, Washington
 Alt. US 99 – Riverton Heights to Seattle, Washington
 Alt. US 99 – Georgetown to Seattle, Washington
 Bus. US 99 – Seattle
 Byp. US 99 – Seattle
 Alt. US 99 – Fairmont to Everett, Washington
 Alt. US 99 – Burlington to Bellingham, Washington
 Alt. US 99 – Bellingham, Washington to the Canada–US border

US 101

 Bus. US 101 – Chula Vista to National City, California
 Bus. US 101 – San Diego
 Alt. US 101 – Capistrano Beach to Oxnard, California
 Bus. US 101 – Buena Park, California
 Bus. US 101 – Anaheim, California
 Alt. US 101 – Long Beach, California
 Bus. US 101 – Los Angeles
 Byp. US 101 – Anaheim to Los Angeles, California
 Alt. US 101 – Santa Monica, California
 Bus. US 101 – Universal City to Woodland Hills, California
 Bus. US 101 – Ventura, California
 Bus. US 101 – Santa Maria, California
 Bus. US 101 – Arroyo Grande, California
 Bus. US 101 – Paso Robles, California
 Bus. US 101 – King City, California
 Bus. US 101 – Greenfield, California
 Bus. US 101 – Soledad, California
 Bus. US 101 – Gonzales, California
 Bus. US 101 – Salinas, California
 Bus. US 101 – Gilroy to San Jose, California
 Byp. US 101 – San Jose to San Francisco, California
 Alt. US 101 – San Francisco, California
 Bus. US 101 – Novato, California
 Bus. US 101 – Petaluma, California
 Bus. US 101 – Santa Rosa, California
 Bus. US 101 – Cloverdale, California
 Bus. US 101 – Ukiah, California
 Bus. US 101 – Rio Dell, California
 Bus. US 101 – Fortuna, California
 Bus. US 101 – McKinleyville, California
 Bus. US 101 – Warrenton to Astoria, Oregon
 Alt. US 101 – Ilwaco, Washington
 Alt. US 101 – Long Beach, Washington
 Truck US 101 – Port Angeles, Washington

US 102 – US 199

US 104
 Alt. US 104 – Niagara Falls, New York

US 111
 Alt. US 111 – Parkton, Maryland to York, Pennsylvania

US 112
 US 112S – Rolling Prairie, Indiana to Union, Michigan
 Bus. US 112 – Niles, Michigan
 Bus. US 112 – Ypsilanti, Michigan
 Byp. US 112 – Ypsilanti, Michigan

US 113
 Bus. US 113 – Snow Hill, Maryland
 Alt. US 113 – Little Heaven to Dover, Delaware

US 117
 Temp. US 117 - Wilmington to Castle Hayne, North Carolina
 Alt. US 17 - Burgaw, North Carolina
 Bus. US 117 - Burgaw, North Carolina
 Conn. US 17 - Calypso, North Carolina
 Bus. US 117 - Calypso to Mount Olive, North Carolina
 Alt. US 117 - Calypso to Brogden, North Carolina
 Conn. US 117 - Calypso, North Carolina
 Alt. US 117 - Goldsboro, North Carolina
 Bus. US 117 - Goldsboro, North Carolina
 Alt. US 117 - Goldsboro to Wilson, North Carolina

US 119
 Spur US 119 – Williamson, West Virginia
 Spur US 119 – Charleston, West Virginia
 Truck US 119 – Uniontown, Pennsylvania
 Alt. US 119 – Greensburg, Pennsylvania

US 123
 Bus. US 123 – Seneca, South Carolina
 Bus. US 123 – Easley, South Carolina
 Conn. US 123 – Easley, South Carolina
 Alt. US 123 – Easley to Greenville, South Carolina

US 127

 Bus. US 127 - Albany, Kentucky
 Bus. US 127 - Jamestown, Kentucky
 Bus. US 127 - Hustonville, Kentucky
 Byp. US 127 - Danville, Kentucky
 Byp. US 127 - Harrodsburg, Kentucky
 Byp. US 127 - Lawrenceburg, Kentucky
 Truck US 127 - Cincinnati, Ohio
 Alt. US 127 - Hamilton, Ohio
 Bus. US 127 - Greenville, Ohio
 Bus. US 127 - Summit Township to Blackman Charter Township, Michigan
 Bus. US 127 - Mason, Michigan
 Bus. US 127 - Lansing to DeWitt Charter Township, Michigan
 Bus. US 127 - Olive Township to Bingham Township, Michigan
 Bus. US 127 - Ithaca, Michigan
 Bus. US 127 - Alma, Michigan
 Bus. US 127 - St. Louis to Pine River Township, Michigan
 Bus. US 127 - Union Charter Township to Mount Pleasant, Michigan
 Bus. US 127 - Vernon Township to Clare, Michigan
 Bus. US 127 - Hayes Township to Harrison, Michigan

US 129

 Alt. US 129 - Old Town to Branford, Florida
 Temp. US 129 - Branford to Live Oak, Florida
 Bus. US 129 - Hawkinsville, Georgia
 Alt. US 129 - Hawkinsville to Macon, Georgia, via Cochran
 Bus. US 129 - Eatonton, Georgia
 Byp. US 129 - Madison, Georgia
 Bus. US 129 - Watkinsville, Georgia
 Bus. US 129 - Arcade to Jefferson, Georgia
 Alt. US 129 - Jefferson, Georgia
 Bus. US 129 - Gainesville, Georgia
 Byp. US 129 - Gainesville, Georgia
 Byp. US 129 - Cleveland, Georgia
 Truck US 129 - Blairsville, Georgia

US 130
 Alt. US 130 – New Brunswick, New Jersey 
 Alt. US 130 – Bridgeport to Thorofare, New Jersey

US 131

 Bus. US 131 - Constantine Township to Constantine, Michigan
 Bus. US 131 - Three Rivers, Michigan
 Bus. US 131 - Kalamazoo, Michigan
 Bus. US 131 - Grand Rapids, Michigan
 Byp. US 131 - Grand Rapids to Plainfield Township, Michigan
 Bus. US 131 - Big Rapids Township to Big Rapids, Michigan
 Bus. US 131 - Cadillac, Michigan
 Bus. US 131 - Cedar Creek Township to Liberty Township, Michigan

US 136
 Bus. US 136 – Albany, Missouri
 Bus. US 136 – Memphis, Missouri
 Spur US 136 – Arbela, Missouri
 Bus. US 136 – Kahoka, Missouri
 Spur US 136 – Wayland, Missouri

US 141
 Bus. US 141 – Sheboygan, Wisconsin
 Bus. US 141 – Manitowoc, Wisconsin
 Bus. US 141 – Coleman to Pound, Wisconsin

US 150
 Bus. US 150 - Peoria, Illinois
 City US 150 - Peoria, Illinois
 Bus. US 150 - Champaign, Illinois
 Temp. US 150 - Ogden to Paris, Illinois
 Truck US 150 - Louisville, Kentucky
 Truck US 150 - Bardstown, Kentucky
 Bus. US 150 - Springfield, Kentucky
 Bus. US 150 - Danville, Kentucky
 Byp. US 150 - Danville, Kentucky
 Bus. US 150 - Stanford, Kentucky
 Byp. US 150 - Stanford, Kentucky

US 151

 Bus. US 151 – Cedar Rapids to Marion, Iowa
 Bus. US 151 – Monticello, Iowa
 Bus. US 151 – Cascade, Iowa
 Bus. US 151 – Platteville, Wisconsin
 Bus. US 151 – Mineral Point, Wisconsin
 Bus. US 151 – Dodgeville, Wisconsin
 Bus. US 151 – Mount Horeb, Wisconsin
 Bus. US 151 – Verona, Wisconsin
 Bus. US 151 – Sun Prairie, Wisconsin
 Bus. US 151 – Columbus, Wisconsin
 Bus. US 151 – Beaver Dam, Wisconsin
 Bus. US 151 – Waupun, Wisconsin

US 154
 Spur US 154 - Dodge City, Kansas

US 158
 Bus. US 158 – Winston-Salem, North Carolina
 US 158A – Oxford, North Carolina
 Bus. US 158 – Oxford, North Carolina
 US 158A – Henderson, North Carolina
 Bus. US 158 – Henderson, North Carolina
 US 158A – Warrenton, North Carolina
 Bus. US 158 – Warrenton, North Carolina
 Bus. US 158 – Murfreesboro, North Carolina
 US 158A – Gatesville, North Carolina
 Bus. US 158 – Gatesville, North Carolina
 Bus. US 158 – Nags Head to Kill Devil Hills, North Carolina

US 160

 Bus. US 160 – Mancos, Colorado
 Bus. US 160 – Durango, Colorado
 Bus. US 160 – Bayfield, Colorado
 Bus. US 160 – Willard, Missouri
 City US 160 – Springfield, Missouri

US 165
 Bus. US 165 – Alexandria to Pineville, Louisiana
 Byp. US 165 – Alexandria, Louisiana
 Bus. US 165 – south of Richwood to Monroe, Louisiana
 Byp. US 165 – Monroe, Louisiana
 US 165C – Gillett, Arkansas
 US 165B – Gillett, Arkansas

US 166
 Bus. US 166 – Sedan, Kansas
 Bus. US 166 – Joplin, Missouri
 Bus. US 166 – Springfield, Missouri
 City US 166 – Springfield, Missouri
 Truck US 166 – Springfield, Missouri

US 167
 Bus. US 167 – Alexandria, Louisiana
 US 167B – El Dorado, Arkansas
 US 167B – Sheridan, Arkansas
 US 167B – Thornton, Arkansas

US 169

 Temp. US 169 – Tulsa, Oklahoma
 Alt. US 169 – Nowata, Oklahoma
 Bus. US 169 – Garnett, Kansas
 Alt. US 169 – Kansas City, Kansas to Northmoor, Missouri
 Spur US 169 – Smithville, Missouri
 Bus. US 169 – Fort Dodge, Iowa
 Bus. US 169 – Hibbing, Minnesota
 Bus. US 169 – Chisholm, Minnesota

US 171
 Bus. US 171 – Zwolle, Louisiana

US 175

 Bus. US 175 – Crandall, Texas
 Bus. US 175 – Kemp, Texas
 Bus. US 175 – Mabank, Texas
 Bus. US 175 – Athens, Texas
 Bus. US 175 - Poynor, Texas

US 176
 Alt. US 176 – Inman, South Carolina
 Alt. US 176 – Spartanburg, South Carolina
 Conn. US 176 – Spartanburg, South Carolina
 Conn. US 176 – Spartanburg, South Carolina
 Bus. US 176 – Union, South Carolina
 Conn. US 176 – Union, South Carolina
 Conn. US 176 – Whitmire, South Carolina

US 178
 Conn. US 178 – Northlake, South Carolina
 Bus. US 178 – Greenwood, South Carolina
 Byp. US 178 – Greenwood, South Carolina
 Conn. US 178 – Saluda, South Carolina
 Alt. US 178 – Stedman, South Carolina
 Bus. US 178 – Orangeburg, South Carolina
 Byp. US 178 – Orangeburg, South Carolina
 Conn. US 178 – Orangeburg, South Carolina

US 180
 Alt. US 180 – Hunt to St. Johns, Arizona
 Bus. US 180 – Eagar, Arizona
 Bus. US 180 – El Paso, Texas
 Bus. US 180 – Fort Worth, Texas

US 181
 Bus. US 181 – Beeville, Texas
 Bus. US 181 – Kenedy, Texas (south)
 Bus. US 181 – Kenedy, Texas (north)
 Bus. US 181 – Karnes City, Texas (south)
 Bus. US 181 – Karnes City, Texas (north)

US 183
 Bus. US 183 - Gonzales, Texas
 Bus. US 183 - Austin, Texas
 183A Toll Road - Austin to Leander, Texas
 Temp. US 183 - Baird to Albany, Texas
 Truck US 183 - Cisco, Texas
 Bus. US 183 - Seymour, Texas
 Alt. US 183 - Clinton, Oklahoma
 Alt. US 183 - Hays to Big Creek, Kansas
 Byp. US 183 - Hays, Kansas

US 189
 Alt. US 189 – Hailstone to Wanship, Utah
 Bus. US 189 – Evanston, Wyoming

US 190
 Bus. US 190 – Copperas Cove, Texas
 Bus. US 190 – Killeen to Harker Heights, Texas
 Bus. US 190 – Heidenheimer, Texas
 Bus. US 190 – Baton Rouge, Louisiana
 Byp. US 190 – Baton Rouge, Louisiana
 Bus. US 190 – Covington, Louisiana
 Bus. US 190 – Slidell, Louisiana

US 191
 Bus. US 191 – Douglas, Arizona
 Spur US 191 – Willcox, Arizona
 Spur US 191 – Bowie, Arizona
 Spur US 191 – Luzena, Arizona
 Spur US 191 – Safford, Arizona
 Temp. US 191 – Clifton to Stargo, Arizona
 Bus. US 191 – Helper, Utah
 Bus. US 191 – Lewistown, Montana

US 195
 Spur US 195 – north of Clarkston, Washington to Idaho state line, north of the Clarkston, Washington–Lewiston, Idaho line
 Bus. US 195 – Rosalia, Washington

US 200 – US 299

US 201
 US 201A – Skowhegan to Solon, Maine
 US 201A – Wheeler Hill to Richmond Corner, Maine

US 202

 Truck US 202 – Norristown, Pennsylvania
 Alt. Truck US 202 - Whitpain Township to Montgomery Township, Pennsylvania
 Bus. US 202 - Montgomeryville to Doylestown, Pennsylvania
 Temp. US 202 - Flemington to Bedminster, New Jersey
 Alt. US 202 - Philipstown, New York
 Alt. US 202 - Danbury to Bethel, Connecticut
 Byp. US 202 - Athol, Massachusetts
 Alt. US 202 - East Northwood to Rochester, New Hampshire

US 206
 Byp. US 206 – Hillsborough Township, New Jersey

US 209
Truck US 209 - Pottsville to Tamaqua, Pennsylvania
Truck US 209 - Kresgeville to Brodheadsville, Pennsylvania
 Bus. US 209 - Sciota to Marshalls Creek, Pennsylvania, via Stroudsburg
Truck US 209 - East Stroudsburg to Marshalls Creek, Pennsylvania

US 211
 Bus. US 211 – Luray, Virginia
 Bus. US 211 – Washington, Virginia
 Alt. US 211 – Warrenton to New Baltimore, Virginia
 Bus. US 211 – Warrenton, Virginia

US 212
 Byp. US 212 - Billings, Montana
 Bus. US 212 - Belle Fourche, South Dakota

US 218

 Bus. US 218 – Charles City, Iowa
 Bus. US 218 – Waverly, Iowa
 Bus. US 218 – Mount Pleasant, Iowa

US 219

 Bus. US 219 – Chestnut Ridge, Maryland
 Bus. US 219 – Meyersdale, Pennsylvania
 Alt. US 219 – Carrolltown to Mahaffey, Pennsylvania
 Truck US 219 – Ridgway, Pennsylvania
 Bus. US 219 – southeast of Carrollton to Salamanca, New York

US 220

 Bus. US 220 - Ellerbe, North Carolina
 Alt. US 220 - Emery to Seagrove, North Carolina
 Bus. US 220 - South of Ulah to Level Cross, North Carolina, via Asheboro
 Bus. US 220 - Madison to Mayodan, North Carolina
 Bus. US 220 - Ridgeway, Virginia
 Bus. US 220 - Martinsville to Collinsville, Virginia
 Alt. US 220 - Rocky Mount, Virginia
 Bus. US 220 - Rocky Mount, Virginia
 Alt. US 220 - Roanoke, Virginia
 Bus. US 220 - Roanoke, Virginia
 Bus. US 220 - Clifton Forge, Virginia
 Truck US 220 - La Vale to Cresaptown, Maryland, southbound only, following MD 658 and MD 53
 Bus. US 220 - Bedford, Pennsylvania
 Bus. US 220 - south of Claysburg to Tyrone, Pennsylvania
 Alt. US 220 - Port Matilda to Milesburg, Pennsylvania
 Truck US 220 - Williamsport, Pennsylvania

US 221

 Truck US 221 - Perry, Florida
 Truck US 221 - Hazlehurst, Georgia
 Byp. US 221 - Greenwood, South Carolina
 Bus. US 221 - Greenwood, South Carolina
 Truck US 221 - Laurens, South Carolina
 Alt. US 221 - Chesnee, South Carolina to Rutherfordton, North Carolina
 Conn. US 221 - Chesnee, South Carolina
 Conn. US 221 - Chesnee, South Carolina
 Bus. US 221 - Marion, North Carolina
 Truck US 221 - Linville to Boone, North Carolina
 Bus. US 221 - West Jefferson to Jefferson, North Carolina
 Bus. US 221 - Bedford, Virginia

US 222
 Bus. US 222 - Reading, Pennsylvania
 Truck US 222 - Perryville to Conowingo, Maryland

US 223
 Bus. US 223 – Adrian, Michigan

US 224
 Bus. US 224 – Van Wert, Ohio
 Alt. US 224 – Boardman to Poland, Ohio

US 230
 Byp. US 230 – Harrisburg to Highspire, Pennsylvania

US 231

 Bus. US 231 – Dothan, Alabama
 Bus. US 231 – Ozark, Alabama
 Bus. US 231 – Montgomery, Alabama
 Alt. US 231 – Sylacauga to Pell City, Alabama
 Bus. US 231 – Huntsville, Alabama
 Bus. US 231 - Shelbyville, Tennessee
 Truck US 231 – Shelbyville, Tennessee
 Bus. US 231 (1984) – Bowling Green, Kentucky
 Bus. US 231 (1999–present) – Bowling Green, Kentucky
 Truck US 231 – Morgantown, Kentucky
 Byp. US 231 – Lafayette, Indiana

US 240
 Alt. US 240 – Washington, D.C.
 Alt. US 240 – Washington, D.C. to Bethesda, Maryland

US 250
 Bus. US 250 – New Philadelphia, Ohio
 Temp. US 250 – Silver Road Junction to Jefferson, Ohio
 Truck US 250 – Philippi, West Virginia
 Truck US 250 – Staunton, Virginia
 Alt. US 250 – Charlottesville, Virginia
 Bus. US 250 – Charlottesville, Virginia
 Byp. US 250 – Charlottesville, Virginia

US 258
 Bus. US 258 – Kinston, North Carolina
 Truck US 258 – Snow Hill, North Carolina
 Bus. US 258 – Farmville, North Carolina
 Bus. US 258 – Franklin, Virginia
 Alt. US 258 – Smithfield, Virginia
 Bus. US 258 – Smithfield, Virginia
 Truck US 258 – Smithfield, Virginia

US 259
 Bus. US 259 – Kilgore, Texas
 Byp. US 259 – Idabel, Oklahoma

US 260
 Alt. US 260 – Springerville to Eagar, Arizona

US 264
 Alt. US 264 - west-northwest of Middlesex to Greenville, North Carolina
 Bus. US 264 - Middlesex to Sims, North Carolina
 US 264A - Wilson, North Carolina
 Alt. US 264 - Wilson to Greenville, North Carolina
 Bus. US 264 - Wilson, North Carolina
 US 264A - Farmville, North Carolina
 Alt. US 264 - Farmville to Greenville, North Carolina
 US 264A - Greenville, North Carolina
 Bus. US 264 - Greenville, North Carolina
 US 264A - Belhaven, North Carolina
 Bus. US 264 - Belhaven, North Carolina
 Byp. US 264 - Manns Harbor to Manteo, North Carolina

US 270
 Bus. US 270 – Shawnee, Oklahoma
 Bus. US 270 – Wewoka, Oklahoma
 Bus. US 270 – Holdenville, Oklahoma
 US 270B – Hot Springs, Arkansas
 US 270B – Magnet Cove, Arkansas
 US 270B – Malvern, Arkansas

US 271

 Bus. US 271 - Pittsburg, Texas
 Bus. US 271 - Mount Pleasant, Texas
 Bus. US 271 - Bogata, Texas
 Bus. US 271 - Deport, Texas
 Bus. US 271 - Paris, Texas
 Bus. US 271 - Hugo, Oklahoma
 Bus. US 271 - Poteau, Oklahoma

US 275
 City US 275 – Omaha, Nebraska
 Alt. US 275 – Waterloo to Fremont, Nebraska
 Bus. US 275 – Fremont, Nebraska

US 276
 Conn. US 276 – Travelers Rest, South Carolina
 Bus. US 276 – Greenville, South Carolina
 Bus. US 276 – Greenville, South Carolina
 Byp. US 276 – Greenville, South Carolina

US 277
 Bus. US 277 – Eagle Pass, Texas
 Spur US 277 – Eagle Pass, Texas
 Spur US 277 – Del Rio, Texas
 Bus. US 277 – Abilene, Texas
 Bus. US 277 – Stamford, Texas
 Bus. US 277 – Haskell, Texas
 Bus. US 277 – Weinert, Texas
 Bus. US 277 – Munday, Texas
 Bus. US 277 – Seymour, Texas
 Bus. US 277 – Holliday, Texas
 Alt. US 277 – Wichita Falls, Texas
 Bus. US 277 – Wichita Falls, Texas

US 278

 US 278B – Hope, Arkansas
 US 278B – Camden, Arkansas
 US 278B – Warren, Arkansas
 Bus. US 278 – Piedmont, Alabama
 Bus. US 278 – Rockmart, Georgia
 Truck US 278 – Madison, Georgia
 Byp. US 278 – Warrenton, Georgia
 Truck US 278 – Warrenton, Georgia
 Conn. US 278 – Ridgeland, South Carolina
 Bus. US 278 – Hilton Head Island, South Carolina

US 281
 Temp. US 281 – Brownsville to Pharr, Texas
 Spur US 281 – Hidalgo, Texas
 Bus. US 281 – Edinburg, Texas
 Bus. US 281 – Encino, Texas
 Bus. US 281 – Falfurrias, Texas
 Bus. US 281 – Alice, Texas
 Alt. US 281 – southeast of Whitsett to Campbellton, Texas
 Bus. US 281 – Wichita Falls, Texas
 Bus. US 281 – Lawton, Oklahoma
 Spur US 281 – Geary, Oklahoma
 Alt. US 281 – Great Bend, Kansas
 Byp. US 281 – Great Bend, Kansas
 Truck US 281 – Jamestown, North Dakota

US 283
 Bus. US 283 – Seymour, Texas
 Spur US 283 – WaKeeney, Kansas

US 285
 Alt. US 285 – Artesia to South Springs Acres, New Mexico
 Truck US 285 – Roswell, New Mexico
 Alt. US 285 – Santa Fe, New Mexico
 Byp. US 285 – Santa Fe, New Mexico

US 287

 Bus. US 287 – Grapeland, Texas
 Bus. US 287 – Corsicana, Texas
 Bus. US 287 – Ennis, Texas
 Bus. US 287 – Waxahachie, Texas
 Bus. US 287 – Midlothian, Texas
 Bus. US 287 – Mansfield to northwest of Saginaw, Texas
 Bus. US 287 - Rhome, Texas
 Bus. US 287 – Decatur, Texas
 Bus. US 287 – Alvord, Texas
 Bus. US 287 – Wichita Falls to Iowa Park, Texas
 Bus. US 287 – Electra, Texas
 Bus. US 287 – Vernon, Texas
 Bus. US 287 – South Amarillo, Texas
 Bus. US 287 – North Amarillo, Texas
 Bus. US 287 – Rawlins, Wyoming
 Byp. US 287 – Rawlins, Wyoming

US 290
 Bus. US 290 – Austin, Texas
 Bus. US 290 – Brenham, Texas
 Bus. US 290 – Hempstead to Hockley, Texas
 Bus. US 290 – Cypress, Texas

US 300 – US 399

US 301

 Bus. US 301 - Dade City, Florida
 Truck US 301 - Dade City, Florida
 Alt. US 301 - Ocala to Citra, Florida
 Alt. US 301  - Starke, Florida
 Byp. US 301 - Statesboro, Georgia
 Bus. US 301 - Sylvania, Georgia
 Conn. US 301 - Alcolu, South Carolina
 Conn. US 301 - Alcolu, South Carolina
 Truck US 301 - Florence, South Carolina
 US 301A - Lumberton, North Carolina
 Bus. US 301 - Lumberton, North Carolina
 US 301A - Fayetteville, North Carolina
 Bus. US 301 - Fayetteville, North Carolina
 US 301A - Wilson, North Carolina
 Bus. US 301 - Wilson, North Carolina
 Bus. US 301 - Elm City, North Carolina
 US 301A - Rocky Mount, North Carolina
 Bus. US 301 - Rocky Mount, North Carolina
 US 301A - Halifax, North Carolina
 Bus. US 301 - Halifax, North Carolina
 Alt. US 301 - Petersburg, Virginia
 Bus. US 301 - Bowling Green, Virginia
 Bus. US 301 - Baltimore
 Truck US 301 - Mount Pleasant to State Road, Delaware

US 302
 Bus. US 302 – Bartlett, New Hampshire (signed as new Hampshire Route 16A)

US 309
 Truck US 309 - Philadelphia, Pennsylvania
 Alt. US 309 - Allentown, Pennsylvania
 Byp. US 309 - Allentown, Pennsylvania

US 311
 Bus. US 311 – southeast of Archdale to High Point, North Carolina

US 319
 Alt. US 319 – Crawfordville to Tallahassee, Florida
 Bus. US 319 – Tallahassee, Florida
 Bus. US 319 – Thomasville, Georgia
 Bus. US 319 – Moultrie, Georgia

US 321
 Bus. US 321 – Winnsboro Mills to Winnsboro, South Carolina
 Bus. US 321 – Chester, South Carolina
 Alt. US 321 – York, South Carolina
 Bus. US 321 – York, South Carolina
 Bus. US 321 – Dallas to Hickory, North Carolina
 US 321A – Lincolnton, North Carolina
 US 321A – Granite Falls to Lenoir, North Carolina
 US 321A – Lenoir, North Carolina
 Bus. US 321 – Blowing Rock, North Carolina
 Truck US 321 – Boone, North Carolina
 Truck US 321 - Greeneville, Tennessee

US 322

 Alt. US 322 – Jamestown to Franklin, Pennsylvania
 Bus. US 322 – northwest of Park Forest Village to Boalsburg, Pennsylvania, via State College
 Alt. Truck US 322 – Downingtown, Pennsylvania
 Truck US 322 – Downingtown, Pennsylvania
 Bus. US 322 – West Chester, Pennsylvania
 Bus. US 322 – Mullica Hill, New Jersey

US 331
 Alt. US 331 – Onycha to Opp, Alabama

US 340
 Bus. US 340 – west of Alma to Luray, Virginia
 Byp. US 340 – Stanley, Virginia
 Alt. US 340 – White Post to Berryville, Virginia
 Bus. US 340 – Charles Town, West Virginia
 Alt. US 340 – Harpers Ferry, West Virginia

US 341
 Bus. US 341 – Eastman, Georgia
 Bus. US 341 – Hawkinsville, Georgia
 Byp. US 341 – Perry, Georgia

US 350
 Byp. US 350 – Trinidad, Colorado

US 360
 Bus. US 360 - Keysville, Virginia
 Bus. US 360 - Burkeville, Virginia
 Bus. US 360 - Amelia Court House, Virginia
 Bus. US 360 - Mechanicsville, Virginia

US 377
 Bus. US 377 – Stephenville, Texas
 Bus. US 377 – Granbury, Texas
 Bus. US 377 – Pilot Point, Texas
 Bus. US 377 – Tioga, Texas
 Bus. US 377 – Collinsville, Texas
 Bus. US 377 – Whitesboro, Texas

US 378
 Bus. US 378 – Washington, Georgia
 Bus. US 378 – Sumter, South Carolina
 Bus. US 378 – Lake City, South Carolina
 Byp. US 378 – Lake City, South Carolina
 Truck US 378 – Conway to Hickory Grove, Horry County, South Carolina

US 380
 Bus. US 380 – Bridgeport, Texas
 Bus. US 380 – Decatur, Texas
 Truck US 380 – Denton, Texas
 Bus. US 380 – Floyd, Texas

US 385
 Truck US 385 – Hill City, South Dakota

US 395
 Bus. US 395 – Riverside, California
 Bus. US 395 – Colton to San Bernardino, California
 Bus. US 395 – Ridgecrest, California
 Bus. US 395 – Carson City, Nevada
 Temp. US 395 – Carson City, Nevada
 Alt. US 395 – Washoe Valley to Reno, Nevada
 Bus. US 395 – Reno, Nevada
 Temp. US 395 – Reno, Nevada

US 400 – US 499

US 401

 Bus. US 401 – Bennettsville, South Carolina
 US 401A – Laurinburg, North Carolina
 Bus. US 401 – Laurinburg, North Carolina
 Bus. US 401 – Raeford, North Carolina
 Bus. US 401 – Fayetteville, North Carolina
 Byp. US 401 – Fayetteville, North Carolina
 Bus. US 401 - Rolesville, North Carolina

US 411
 Alt. US 411 – Centre, Alabama,  to Rome, Georgia
 Bus. US 411 – Centre, Alabama
 Temp. US 411 – Centre, Alabama to Rome, Georgia

US 412

 Alt. US 412 - Locust Grove to Kansas, Oklahoma
 Scenic US 412 - Locust Grove to Kansas, Oklahoma
 Spur US 412 - Springdale, Arkansas
 US 412B - Hindsville, Arkansas
 US 412B - Huntsville, Arkansas
 US 412B - Paragould, Arkansas
 Bus. US 412 - Jackson, Tennessee
 Bus. US 412 - Columbia, Tennessee

US 421

 Bus. US 421 – Wilmington, North Carolina
 Truck US 421 – Wilmington, North Carolina
 Bus. US 421 – Harrells, North Carolina
 US 421A – Clinton, North Carolina
 Bus. US 421 – Clinton, North Carolina
 Bus. US 421 – Sanford, North Carolina
 Conn. US 421 – Sanford, North Carolina
 Bus. US 421 – Siler City to Staley, North Carolina
 US 421A – North Wilkesboro, North Carolina
 Bus. US 421 – North Wilkesboro to Wilkesboro, North Carolina
 Truck US 421 – Boone, North Carolina
 Bus. US 421 – Gate City, Virginia
 Bus. US 421 – Richmond, Kentucky
 Bus. US 421 – Lexington, Kentucky

US 422

 Bus. US 422 - New Castle, Pennsylvania
 Bus. US 422 - West Kittanning to Kittanning, Pennsylvania
 Bus. US 422 - Indiana, Pennsylvania
 Alt. US 422 - Reading, Pennsylvania
 Bus. US 422 - Reading, Pennsylvania
 Alt. US 422 - Norristown to Philadelphia, Pennsylvania
 Byp. US 422 - Barren Hill to Philadelphia, Pennsylvania

US 431

 Bus. US 431 – Dothan, Alabama
 Truck US 431 – Seale, Alabama
 Byp. US 431 – Phenix City, Alabama
 Bus. US 431 – Anniston, Alabama
 Byp. US 431 – Gadsden, Alabama
 Bus. US 431 - Lewisburg, Tennessee
 Bus. US 431 – Franklin, Tennessee
 Truck US 431 - Franklin, Tennessee
 Bus. US 431 – Russellville, Kentucky

US 441

 Bus. US 441 – Tangerine to Tavares, Florida
 Truck US 441 – Eustis, Florida
 Truck US 441 – Leesburg, Florida
 Alt. US 441 – Lady Lake to Belleview, Florida
 Truck US 441 – Lake City, Florida
 Alt. US 441 – Ocala to Reddick, Florida
 Byp. US 441 – Dublin, Georgia
 Bus. US 441 – Milledgeville, Georgia
 Bus. US 441 – Eatonton, Georgia
 Byp. US 441 – Madison, Georgia
 Bus. US 441 – Watkinsville, Georgia
 Temp. US 441 – Athens, Georgia
 Bus. US 441 – Commerce, Georgia
 Bus. US 441 – Baldwin to Hollywood, Georgia
 Bus. US 441 – Franklin, North Carolina
 Bus. US 441 – Cherokee, North Carolina
 Byp. US 441 – Gatlinburg, Tennessee

US 460

 Spur US 460 - St. Louis, Missouri
 Alt. US 460 - Mount Vernon, Illinois
 Byp. US 460 - Louisville, Kentucky
 Byp. US 460 - Georgetown, Kentucky
 Bus. US 460 - Paintsville to Prestonsburg, Kentucky
 Bus. US 460 - Pikeville, Kentucky
 Bus. US 460 - Grundy, Virginia
 Bus. US 460 - Richlands to Cedar Bluff, Virginia
 Bus. US 460 - Tazewell, Virginia
 Temp. US 460 - Bluefield, Virginia to Bluefield, West Virginia
 Bus. US 460 - Pearisburg to Ripplemead, Virginia
 Bus. US 460 - Blacksburg to Christiansburg, Virginia
 Byp. US 460 - Christiansburg, Virginia
 Alt. US 460 - Salem, Virginia
 Bus. US 460 - Bedford, Virginia
 Byp. US 460 - Bedford, Virginia
 Bus. US 460 - Timberlake to Lynchburg, Virginia
 Bus. US 460 - Appomattox, Virginia
 Bus. US 460 - Pamplin City, Virginia
 Bus. US 460 - Farmville, Virginia
 Bus. US 460 - Burkeville, Virginia
 Bus. US 460 - Nottoway to Blackstone, Virginia
 Alt. US 460 - Petersburg, Virginia
 Bus. US 460 - Petersburg, Virginia
 Bus. US 460 - Suffolk, Virginia
 Alt. US 460 - Norfolk to Chesapeake, Virginia

US 466
 Alt. US 466 – Las Vegas, Nevada

US 500 – US 599

US 501

 Alt. US 501 - Myrtle Beach, South Carolina
 Bus. US 501 - Conway, South Carolina
 Alt. US 501 - Marion, South Carolina
 Bus. US 501 - Marion, South Carolina
 Bus. US 501 - Laurinburg, North Carolina
 US 501A - Sanford, North Carolina
 Bus. US 501 - Sanford, North Carolina
 Byp. US 501 - Sanford, North Carolina
 US 501A - Chapel Hill, North Carolina
 Bus. US 501 - Chapel Hill, North Carolina
 Bus. US 501 - Durham, North Carolina
 Byp. US 501 - Durham, North Carolina
 Truck US 501 - South Boston, Virginia
 Alt. US 501 - Lynchburg, Virginia
 Bus. US 501 - Lynchburg, Virginia
 Alt. US 501 - Buena Vista, Virginia
 Alt. US 501 - Buena Vista, Virginia
 Bus. US 501 - Buena Vista, Virginia
 Truck US 501 - Buena Vista, Virginia

US 521

 Bus. US 521 – Andrews, South Carolina
 Conn. US 521 – Sumter, South Carolina
 Truck US 521 – Camden, South Carolina
 Truck US 521 - Camden, South Carolina
 Alt. US 521 – Kershaw, South Carolina
 Bus. US 521 – Kershaw, South Carolina
 Conn. US 521 - Kershaw, South Carolina
 Truck US 521 – Kershaw, South Carolina
 Conn. US 521 – Kershaw, South Carolina
 Bus. US 521 – Lancaster, South Carolina
 Byp. US 521 – Lancaster, South Carolina

US 522
 Bus. US 522 – Washington, Virginia

US 541
 Alt. US 541 – Rockport to Tampa, Florida
 Opt. US 541 – Rockport to Ybor City, Florida

US 550
 Bus. US 550 – Durango, Colorado

US 600 – US 699

US 601

 Truck US 601 - Orangeburg to Wilkinson Heights, South Carolina
 Truck US 601 - Camden, South Carolina
 Bus. US 601 - Kershaw, South Carolina
 Bus. US 601 - Concord, North Carolina
 Byp. US 601 - Concord, North Carolina
 Bus. US 601 - Dobson, North Carolina

US 611
 Alt. US 611 – Philadelphia to Willow Grove, Pennsylvania
 Alt. US 611 – Portland to Stroudsburg, Pennsylvania

US 641
 Bus. US 641 – Murray, Kentucky
 Spur US 641 – Benton, Kentucky
 Truck US 641 – Benton, Kentucky

US 666
 Bus. US 666 - Douglas, Arizona
 Spur US 666 - Bowie, Arizona
 Temp. US 666 - Clifton to Stargo

US 700 – US 799

US 701

 Bus. US 701 – Mount Pleasant, South Carolina
 Truck US 701 – Conway, South Carolina
 Truck US 701 – Conway to Hickory Grove, South Carolina
 Bus. US 701 – Horry County, South Carolina to Tabor City, North Carolina
 Bus. US 701 – Whiteville, North Carolina
 Bus. US 701 – Clarkton, North Carolina
 US 701A – Clinton, North Carolina
 Bus. US 701 – Clinton, North Carolina

US 730
 Spur US 730 – south of Wallula, Washington

See also
 
 List of business routes of the Interstate Highway System

External links
 

 
U.S. Special